= Joseph Conrad =

Polish-British writer (1857–1924)

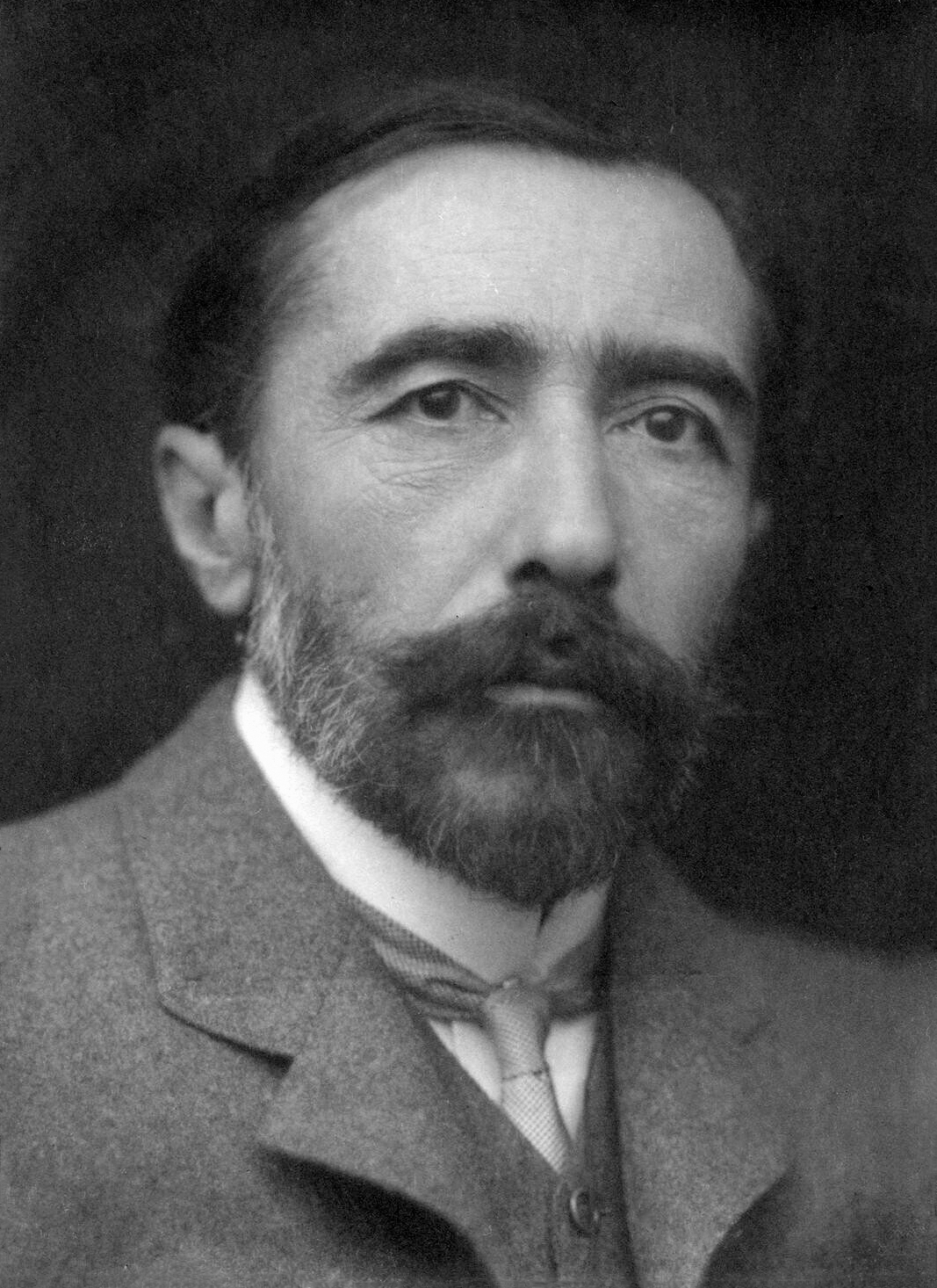
- Conrad in 1904
- Born: Józef Teodor Konrad Korzeniowski; 3 December 1857; Berdychiv, Kiev Governorate, Russian Empire
- Died: 3 August 1924 (aged 66); Bishopsbourne, Kent, England
- Resting place: Canterbury Cemetery, Canterbury
- Occupations: Novelist, short-story writer, essayist
- Spouse: Jessie George (m. 1896)
- Children: 2
- Parent(s): Apollo Korzeniowski; Ewa Bobrowska
- Writing career
- Period: 1895–1923
- Genre: Fiction
- Notable works: Heart of Darkness (1899); Lord Jim (1900); Nostromo (1904); The Secret Agent (1907)
- Movements: Literary impressionism; Modernism; Neo-romanticism

Joseph Conrad (born Józef Teodor Konrad Korzeniowski, Polish: [ˈjuzɛf tɛˈɔdɔr ˈkɔnrat kɔʐɛˈɲɔfskʲi]; 3 December 1857 – 3 August 1924) was a Polish-British novelist and story writer. (Note: Tim Middleton writes: "Referring to his dual Polish and English allegiances he once described himself as 'homo-duplex'—the double man.") He is regarded as one of the greatest writers in the English language and – though he did not speak English fluently until his twenties (always with a strong foreign accent) – he became a master prose stylist who brought a non-English sensibility into English literature. (Note: Rudyard Kipling felt that "with a pen in his hand he was first amongst us" but that there was nothing English in Conrad's mentality: "When I am reading him, I always have the impression that I am reading an excellent translation of a foreign author." Cf. Zdzisław Najder's similar observation: "He was [...] an English writer who grew up in other linguistic and cultural environments. His work can be seen as located in the borderland of auto-translation.")

He wrote novels and stories, many in nautical settings, that depicted crises of human individuality in the midst of what he saw as an indifferent, inscrutable, and amoral world. (Note: Conrad wrote: "In this world—as I have known it—we are made to suffer without the shadow of a reason, of a cause or of guilt.[...] There is no morality, no knowledge and no hope, there is only the consciousness of ourselves which drives us about a world that [...] is always but a vain and fleeting appearance.") Conrad is considered a literary impressionist by some and an early modernist by others, (Note: Conrad wrote of himself in 1902: "I am modern.") though his works also contain elements of 19th-century realism. His narrative style and anti-heroic characters, as in Lord Jim, have influenced numerous authors. Many dramatic films have been adapted from and inspired by his works.

Numerous writers and critics have commented that his fictional works, written mostly in the first two decades of the 20th century, seem to have anticipated later world events. (Note: Colm Tóibín writes: "[B]ecause he kept his doubleness intact, [Conrad] remains our contemporary and perhaps also in the way he made sure that, in a time of crisis as much as in a time of calm, it was the quality of his irony that saved him." V. S. Naipaul writes: "Conrad's value to me is that he is someone who sixty to seventy years ago meditated on my world, a world I recognize today. I feel this about no other writer of the [20th] century." Maya Jasanoff, drawing analogies between events in Conrad's fictions and 21st-century world events, writes: "Conrad's pen was like a magic wand, conjuring the spirits of the future." Adam Hochschild makes the same point about Conrad's seeming prescience in his review of Maya Jasanoff's The Dawn Watch Hochschild also notes: "It is startling... how seldom [in the late 19th century and the first decade of the 20th century, European imperialism in South America, Africa, and Asia] appear[ed] in the work of the era's European writers." Conrad was a notable exception.) Writing near the peak of the British Empire, Conrad drew on the national experiences of his native Poland—during nearly all his life, parcelled out among three occupying empires (Note: H.S. Zins writes: "Conrad made English literature more mature and reflective because he called attention to the sheer horror of political realities overlooked by English citizens and politicians. The case of Poland, his oppressed homeland, was one such issue. The colonial exploitation of Africans was another. His condemnation of imperialism and colonialism, combined with sympathy for its persecuted and suffering victims, was drawn from his Polish background, his own personal sufferings and the experience of a persecuted people living under foreign occupation. Personal memories created in him a great sensitivity for human degradation and a sense of moral responsibility.")—and on his own experiences in the French and British merchant navies, to create short stories and novels that reflect aspects of a European-dominated world—including imperialism and colonialism—and that profoundly explore the human psyche.

== Life ==
=== Early years ===
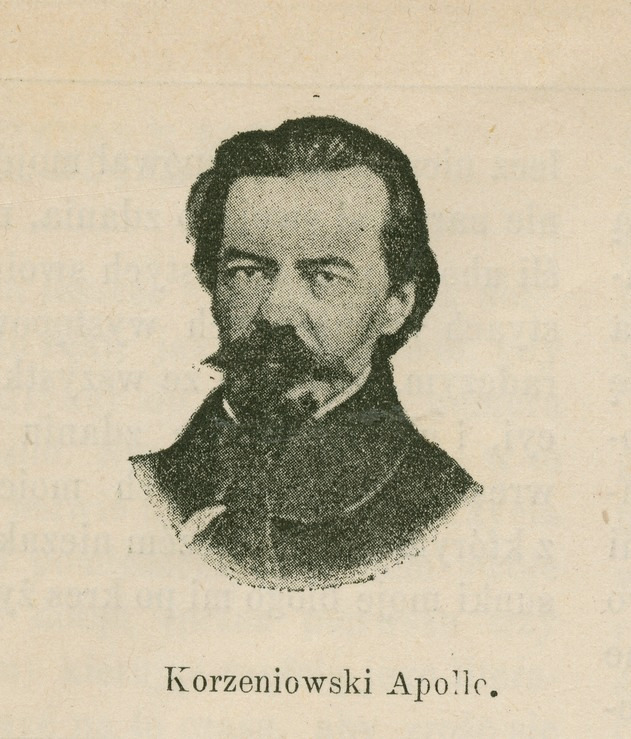
Conrad's writer father, Apollo Korzeniowski

Conrad was born on 3 December 1857, in Berdychiv (Polish: Berdyczów), Ukraine, then part of the Russian Empire; the region had once been part of the Crown of the Kingdom of Poland. He was the only child of Apollo Korzeniowski—a writer, translator, political activist, and would-be revolutionary—and his wife Ewa Bobrowska. He was christened Józef Teodor Konrad Korzeniowski after his maternal grandfather Józef, his paternal grandfather Teodor, and the heroes (both named "Konrad") of two poems by Adam Mickiewicz, Dziady and Konrad Wallenrod. His family called him "Konrad", rather than "Józef". (Note: Conrad's biographer Zdzisław Najder wrote, "... When he was baptized at the age of two days, on 5 December 1857 in Berdyczów, no birth certificate was recorded because the baptism was only 'of water.' And during his official, documented baptism (in Żytomierz) five years later, he himself was absent, as he was in Warsaw, awaiting exile into Russia together with his parents. "Thus there is much occasion for confusion. This is attested by errors on tablets and monuments. But examination of documents—not many, but quite a sufficient number, survive—permits an entirely certain answer to the title question. "On 5 December 1857, the future writer was christened with three given names: Józef (in honor of his maternal grandfather), Teodor (in honor of his paternal grandfather) and Konrad (doubtless in honor of the hero of part III of Adam Mickiewicz's Dziady). These given names, in this order (they appear in no other order in any records), were given by Conrad himself in an extensive autobiographical letter to his friend Edward Garnett of 20 January 1900. "However, in the official birth certificate (a copy of which is found in the Jagiellonian University Library in Kraków, manuscript no. 6391), only one given name appears: Konrad. And that sole given name was used in their letters by his parents, Ewa, née Bobrowska, and Apollo Korzeniowski, as well as by all members of the family. "He himself signed himself with this single given name in letters to Poles. And this single given name, and the surname 'Korzeniowski,' figured in his passport and other official documents. For example, when 'Joseph Conrad' visited his native land after a long absence in 1914, just at the outbreak of World War I, the papers issued to him by the military authorities of the Imperial-Royal Austro-Hungarian Monarchy called him 'Konrad Korzeniowski.'")

Though the vast majority of the surrounding area's inhabitants were Ukrainians, and the great majority of Berdychiv's residents were Jewish, almost all the countryside was owned by the Polish szlachta (nobility), to which Conrad's family belonged as bearers of the Nałęcz coat-of-arms. Polish literature, particularly patriotic literature, was held in high esteem by the area's Polish population.

Poland had been divided among Prussia, Austria and Russia in 1795. The Korzeniowski family had played a significant role in Polish attempts to regain independence. Conrad's paternal grandfather Teodor had served under Prince Józef Poniatowski during Napoleon's Russian campaign and had formed his own cavalry squadron during the November 1830 Uprising of Poland-Lithuania against the Russian Empire. Conrad's fiercely patriotic father Apollo belonged to the "Red" political faction, whose goal was to re-establish the pre-partition boundaries of Poland and that also advocated land reform and the abolition of serfdom. Conrad's subsequent refusal to follow in Apollo's footsteps, and his choice of exile over resistance, were a source of lifelong guilt for Conrad. (Note: "Russia's defeat by Britain, France and Turkey [in the Crimean War] had once again raised hopes of Polish independence. Apollo celebrated his son's christening with a characteristic patriotic–religious poem: "To my son born in the 85th year of Muscovite oppression". It alluded to the partition of 1772, burdened the new-born [...] with overwhelming obligations, and urged him to sacrifice himself as Apollo would for the good of his country: 'Bless you, my little son: Be a Pole! Though foes May spread before you A web of happiness Renounce it all: love your poverty... Baby, son, tell yourself You are without land, without love, Without country, without people, While Poland – your Mother is in her grave For only your Mother is dead – and yet She is your faith, your palm of martyrdom... This thought will make your courage grow, Give Her and yourself immortality.'")

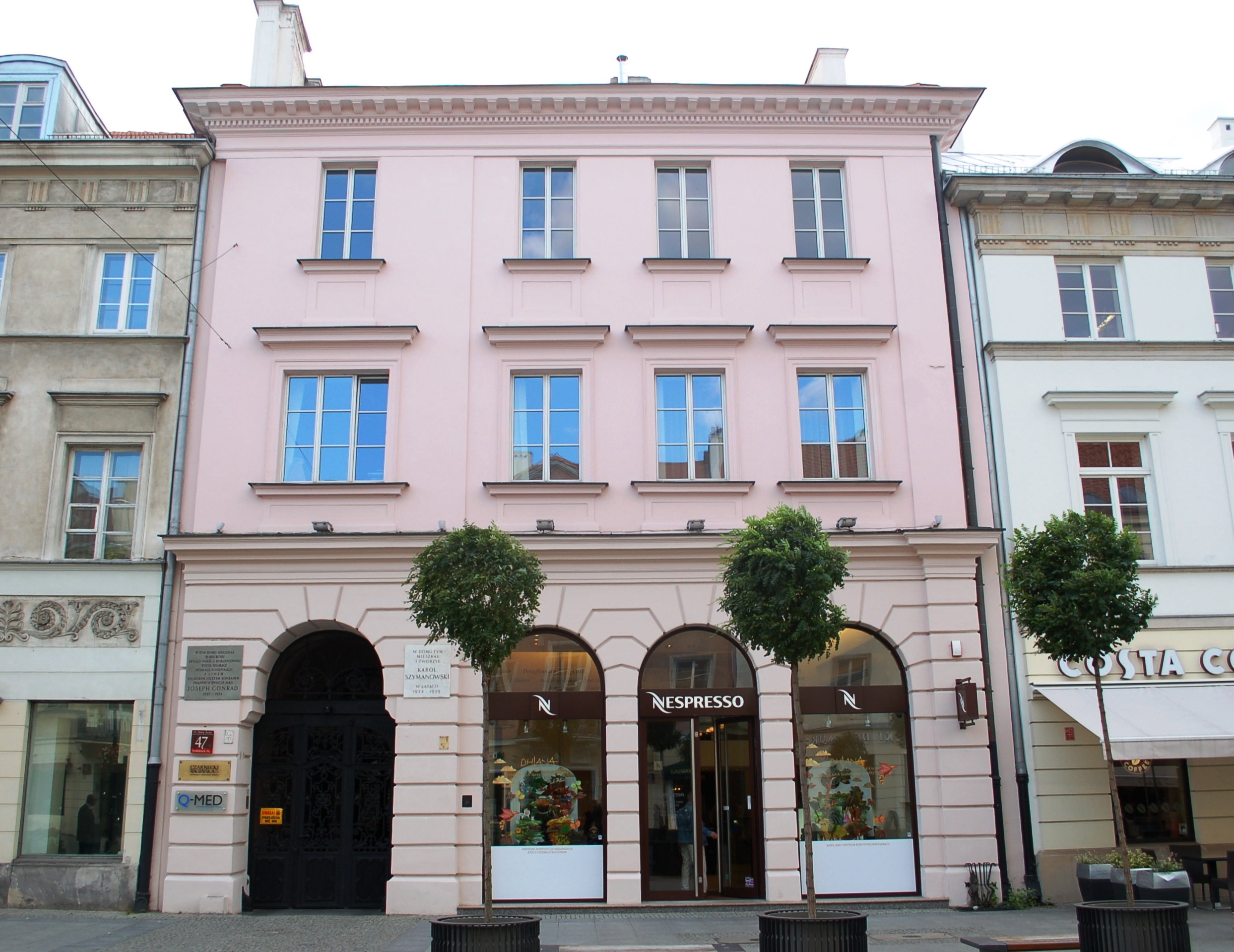
Nowy Świat 47, Warsaw, where three-year-old Conrad lived with his parents in 1861

Because of the father's attempts at farming and his political activism, the family moved repeatedly. In May 1861, they moved to Warsaw, where Apollo joined the resistance against the Russian Empire. He was arrested and imprisoned in Pavilion X (Note: "X" is the Roman numeral for "Ten".) – the dread Tenth Pavilion – of the Warsaw Citadel. Conrad would write: "[I]n the courtyard of this Citadel—characteristically for our nation—my childhood memories begin." On 9 May 1862, Apollo and his family were exiled to Vologda, 500 kilometres (310 mi) north of Moscow and known for its bad climate. In January 1863, Apollo's sentence was commuted, and the family was sent to Chernihiv in northeast Ukraine, where conditions were much better. However, on 18 April 1865, Ewa died of tuberculosis.

Apollo did his best to teach Conrad at home. The boy's early reading introduced him to the two elements that later dominated his life: in Victor Hugo's Toilers of the Sea, he encountered the sphere of activity to which he would devote his youth; Shakespeare brought him into the orbit of English literature. Most of all, though, he read Polish Romantic poetry. Half a century later, he explained that

"The Polishness in my works comes from Mickiewicz and Słowacki. My father read [Mickiewicz's] Pan Tadeusz aloud to me and made me read it aloud.... I used to prefer [Mickiewicz's] Konrad Wallenrod [and] Grażyna. Later I preferred Słowacki. You know why Słowacki?... [He is the soul of all Poland]".

In the autumn of 1866, young Conrad was sent for a year-long retreat, for health reasons, to Kiev and his mother's family estate at Novofastiv.

In December 1867, Apollo took his son to the Austrian-held part of Poland, which for two years had been enjoying considerable internal freedom and a degree of self-government. After sojourns in Lwów and several smaller localities, on 20 February 1869, they moved to Kraków (until 1596 the capital of Poland), likewise in Austrian Poland. A few months later, on 23 May 1869, Apollo Korzeniowski died, leaving Conrad orphaned at the age of eleven. Like Conrad's mother, Apollo had been gravely ill with tuberculosis.

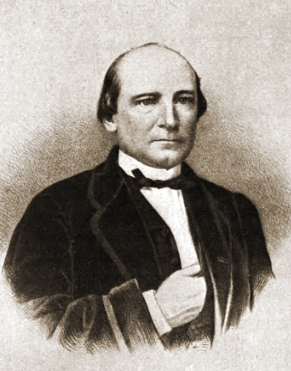
Tadeusz Bobrowski, Conrad's maternal uncle, mentor, benefactor

The young Conrad was placed in the care of Ewa's brother, Tadeusz Bobrowski. Conrad's poor health and his unsatisfactory schoolwork caused his uncle constant problems and no end of financial outlay. Conrad was not a good student; despite tutoring, he excelled only in geography. At that time he likely received only private tutoring, as there is no evidence he attended any school regularly. Since the boy's ill health was clearly of nervous origin, the physicians supposed that fresh air and physical work would harden him; his uncle hoped that well-defined duties and the rigors of work would teach him discipline. Since he showed little inclination to study, it was essential that he learn a trade; his uncle thought he could work as a sailor-cum-businessman, who would combine maritime skills with commercial activities. In the autumn of 1871, thirteen-year-old Conrad announced his intention to become a sailor. He later recalled that as a child he had read (apparently in French translation) Leopold McClintock's book about his 1857–59 expeditions in the Fox, in search of Sir John Franklin's lost ships Erebus and Terror. (Note: It was still an age of exploration, in which Poles participated: Paweł Edmund Strzelecki mapped the Australian interior; the writer Sygurd Wiśniowski, having sailed twice around the world, described his experiences in Australia, Oceania and the United States; Jan Kubary, a veteran of the 1863 Uprising, explored the Pacific islands.) Conrad also recalled having read books by the American James Fenimore Cooper and the English Captain Frederick Marryat. A playmate of his adolescence recalled that Conrad spun fantastic yarns, always set at sea, presented so realistically that listeners thought the action was happening before their eyes.

In August 1873, Bobrowski sent fifteen-year-old Conrad to Lwów to a cousin who ran a small boarding house for boys orphaned by the 1863 Uprising; group conversation there was in French. The owner's daughter recalled:

He stayed with us ten months... Intellectually he was extremely advanced but [he] disliked school routine, which he found tiring and dull; he used to say... he... planned to become a great writer.... He disliked all restrictions. At home, at school, or in the living room he would sprawl unceremoniously. He... suffer[ed] from severe headaches and nervous attacks...

Conrad had been at the establishment for just over a year when in September 1874, for uncertain reasons, his uncle removed him from school in Lwów and took him back to Kraków.

On 13 October 1874, Bobrowski sent the sixteen-year-old to Marseille, France, for Conrad's planned merchant-marine career on French merchant ships, providing him with a monthly stipend of 150 francs. Though Conrad had not completed secondary school, his accomplishments included fluency in French (with a correct accent), some knowledge of Latin, German and Greek; probably a good knowledge of history, some geography, and probably already an interest in physics. He was well read, particularly in Polish Romantic literature. He belonged to the second generation in his family that had had to earn a living outside the family estates. They were born and reared partly in the milieu of the working intelligentsia, a social class that was starting to play an important role in Central and Eastern Europe. He had absorbed enough of the history, culture and literature of his native land to eventually develop a distinctive world view and make unique contributions to the literature of his adoptive Britain.

Tensions that originated in his childhood in Poland and increasing in his adulthood abroad contributed to Conrad's greatest literary achievements. Zdzisław Najder, himself an emigrant from Poland, observed:

Living away from one's natural environment—family, friends, social group, language—even if it results from a conscious decision, usually gives rise to... internal tensions, because it tends to make people less sure of themselves, more vulnerable, less certain of their... position and... value... The Polish szlachta and... intelligentsia were social strata in which reputation... was felt... very important... for a feeling of self-worth. Men strove... to find confirmation of their... self-regard... in the eyes of others... Such a psychological heritage forms both a spur to ambition and a source of constant stress, especially if [one has been inculcated with] the idea of [one]'s public duty...

Some critics have suggested that when Conrad left Poland, he wanted to break once and for all with his Polish past. In refutation of this, Najder quotes from Conrad's 14 August 1883 letter to family friend Stefan Buszczyński, written nine years after Conrad had left Poland:

... I always remember what you said when I was leaving [Kraków]: "Remember"—you said—"wherever you may sail, you are sailing towards Poland!" That I have never forgotten, and never will forget!

=== Merchant marine ===
In Marseille, Conrad had an intense social life, often stretching his budget. A trace of these years can be found in the northern Corsica town of Luri, where there is a plaque to a Corsican merchant seaman, Dominique Cervoni, whom Conrad befriended. Cervoni became the inspiration for some of Conrad's characters, such as the title character of the 1904 novel Nostromo. Conrad visited Corsica with his wife in 1921, partly in search of connections with his long-dead friend and fellow merchant seaman.

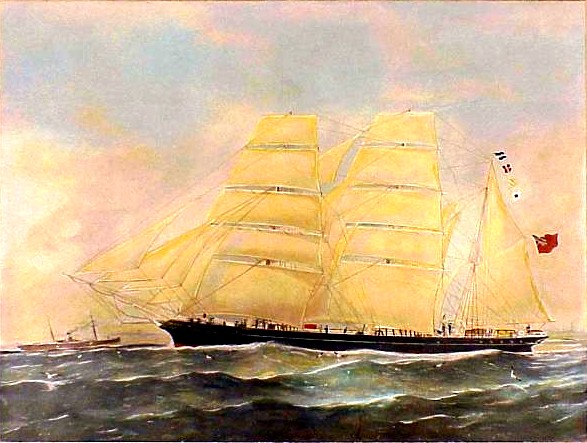
Otago, the barque captained by Conrad in 1888 and first three months of 1889

In late 1877, Conrad's maritime career was interrupted by the refusal of the Russian consul to provide documents needed for him to continue his service. As a result, Conrad fell into debt and, in March 1878, he attempted suicide. He survived, and received further financial aid from his uncle, allowing him to resume his normal life. After nearly four years in France and on French ships, Conrad joined the British merchant marine, enlisting in April 1878 (he had most likely started learning English shortly before).

For the next fifteen years, he served under the Red Ensign. He worked on a variety of ships as crew member (steward, apprentice, able seaman) and then as third, second and first mate, until eventually achieving captain's rank. During the 19 years from the time that Conrad had left Kraków, in October 1874, until he signed off the Adowa, in January 1894, he had worked in ships, including long periods in port, for 10 years and almost 8 months. He had spent just over 8 years at sea—9 months of it as a passenger. His sole captaincy took place in 1888–89, when he commanded the barque Otago from Sydney to Mauritius.

During a brief call in India in 1885–86, 28-year-old Conrad sent five letters to Joseph Spiridion, (Note: Joseph Spiridion's full name was "Joseph Spiridion Kliszczewski" but he used the abbreviated form, presumably from deference to British ignorance of Polish pronunciation. Conrad seems to have picked up this idea from Spiridion: in his fourth letter, he signed himself "J. Conrad"—the first recorded use of his future pen name.) a Pole eight years his senior whom he had befriended at Cardiff in June 1885, just before sailing for Singapore in the clipper ship Tilkhurst. These letters are Conrad's first preserved texts in English. His English is generally correct but stiff to the point of artificiality; many fragments suggest that his thoughts ran along the lines of Polish syntax and phraseology.

More importantly, the letters show a marked change in views from those implied in his earlier correspondence of 1881–83. He had abandoned "hope for the future" and the conceit of "sailing [ever] toward Poland", and his Panslavic ideas. He was left with a painful sense of the hopelessness of the Polish question and an acceptance of England as a possible refuge. While he often adjusted his statements to accord to some extent with the views of his addressees, the theme of hopelessness concerning the prospects for Polish independence often occurs authentically in his correspondence and works before 1914.

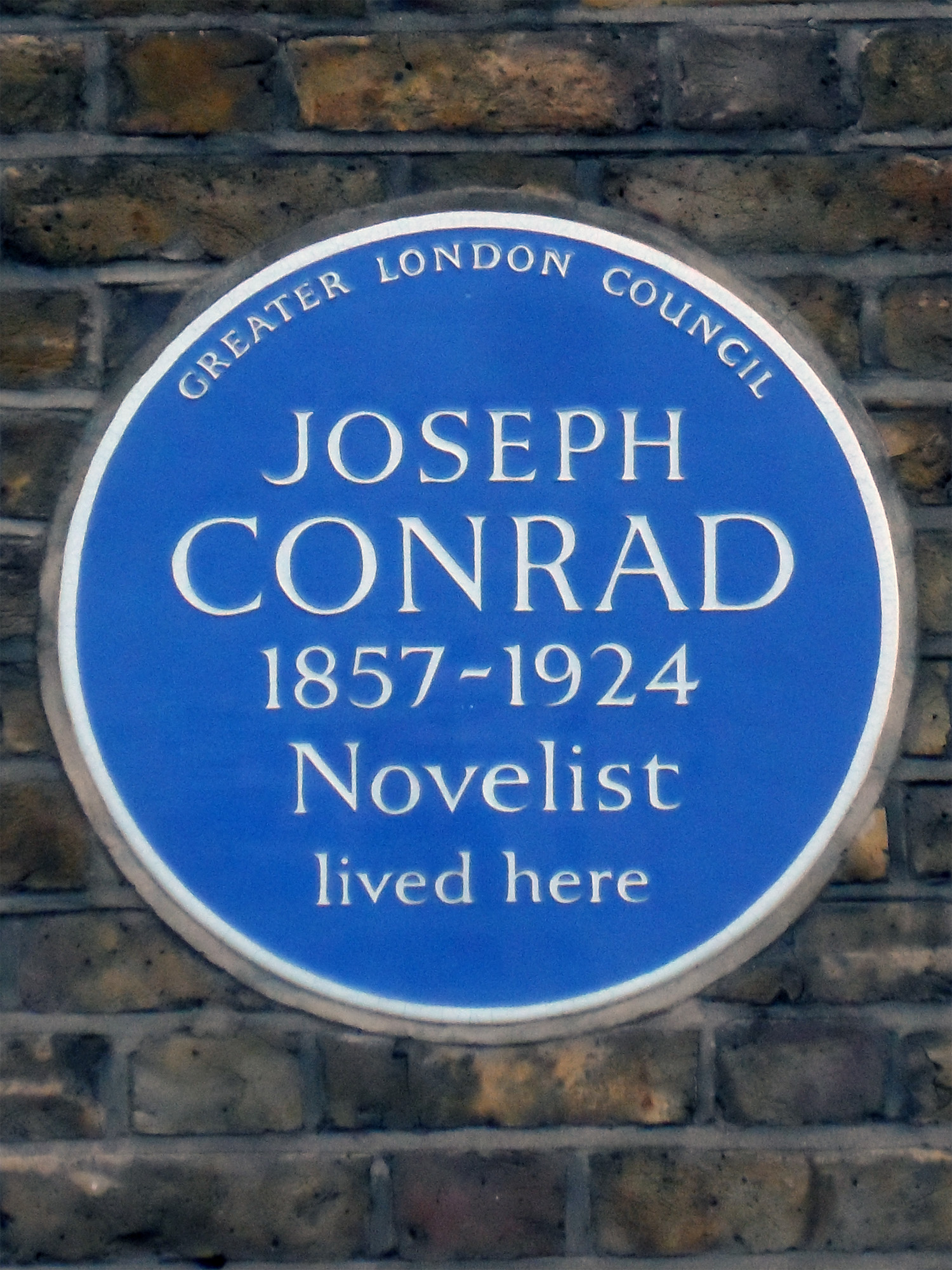
Conrad lived at 17 Gillingham Street, Pimlico, central London after returning from the Congo.

The year 1890 marked Conrad's first return to Poland, where he would visit his uncle and other relatives and acquaintances. This visit took place while he was waiting to proceed to the Congo Free State, having been hired by Albert Thys, deputy director of the Société Anonyme Belge pour le Commerce du Haut-Congo. Conrad's association with the Belgian company, on the Congo River, would inspire his novella Heart of Darkness. During this 1890 period in the Congo, Conrad befriended Roger Casement, who was also working for Thys, operating a trading and transport station in Matadi. In 1903, as British Consul to Boma, Casement was commissioned to investigate abuses in the Congo, and later in Amazonian Peru, and was knighted in 1911 for his advocacy of human rights. Casement later became active in Irish Republicanism after leaving the British consular service. (Note: A quarter-century later, in 1916, when Casement was sentenced to death for treason, Conrad, though he had hoped Casement would not be so sentenced, declined to join an appeal for clemency by many English writers, including Conrad's friend John Galsworthy. In 1920 Conrad told his niece Karola Zagórska, visiting him in England: "Casement did not hesitate to accept honours, decorations and distinctions from the English Government while surreptitiously arranging various affairs that he was embroiled in. In short: he was plotting against those who trusted him.")

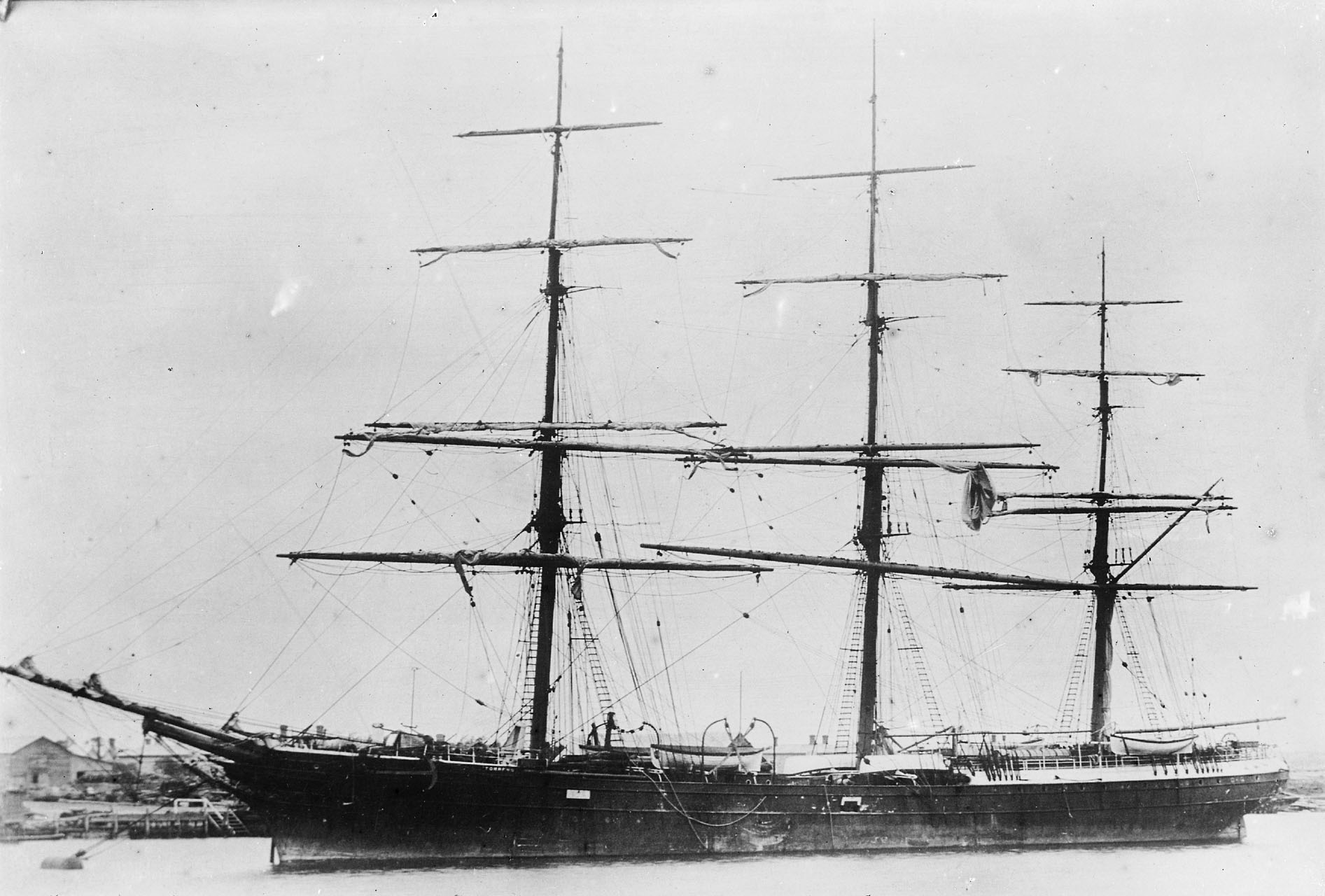
Torrens: Conrad made two round trips as first mate, London to Adelaide, between November 1891 and July 1893.

Conrad left Africa at the end of December 1890, arriving in Brussels by late January of the following year. He rejoined the British merchant marines, as first mate, in November. When he left London on 25 October 1892 aboard the passenger clipper ship Torrens, one of the passengers was William Henry Jacques, a consumptive Cambridge University graduate who died less than a year later on 19 September 1893. According to Conrad's A Personal Record, Jacques was the first reader of the still-unfinished manuscript of Conrad's Almayer's Folly. Jacques encouraged Conrad to continue writing the novel.

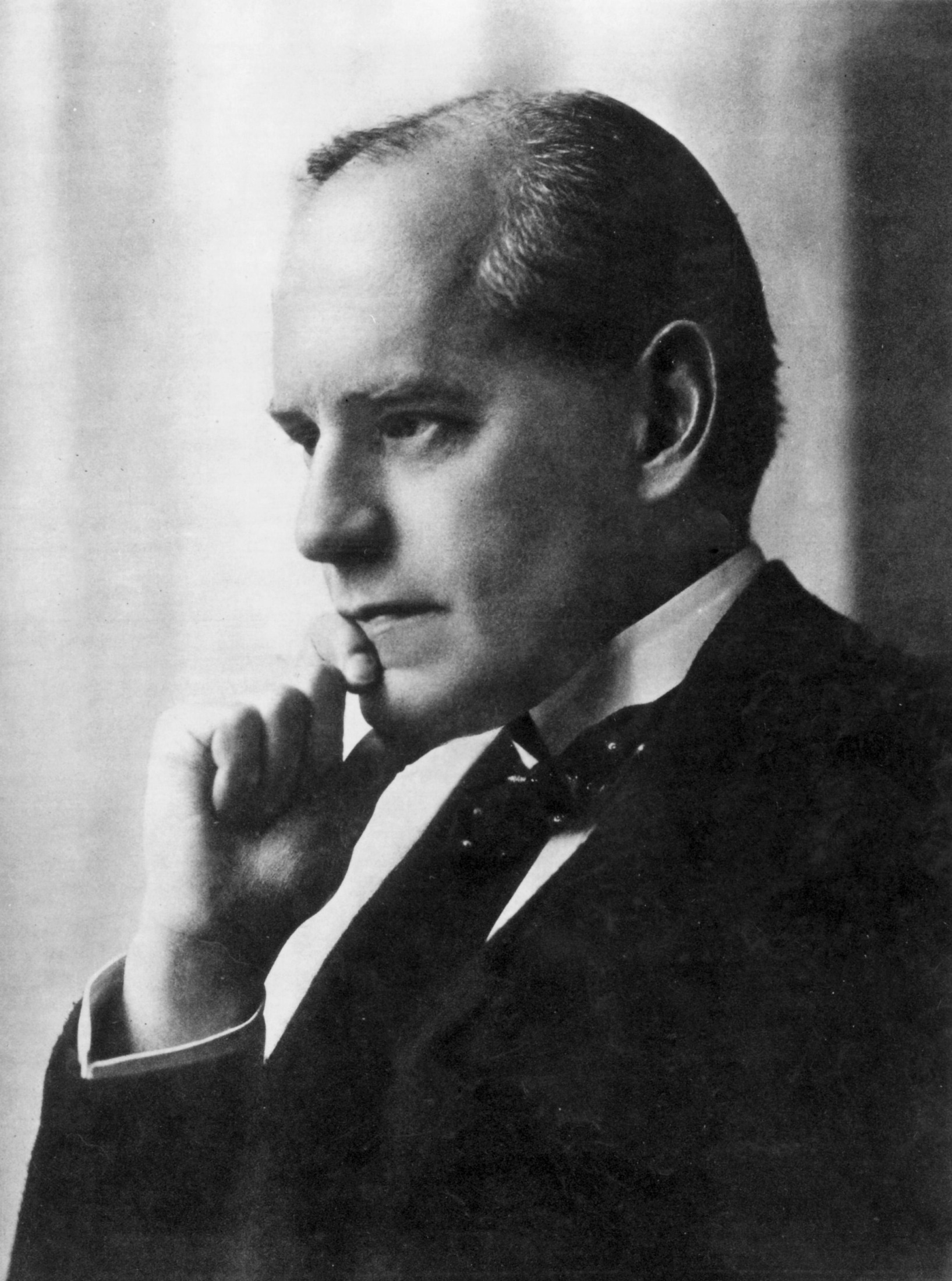
John Galsworthy, whom Conrad met on Torrens

Conrad completed his last long-distance voyage as a seaman on 26 July 1893 when the Torrens docked at London and "J. Conrad Korzemowin"—per the certificate of discharge—debarked.

When the Torrens had left Adelaide on 13 March 1893, the passengers had included two young Englishmen returning from Australia and New Zealand: 25-year-old lawyer and future novelist John Galsworthy; and Edward Lancelot Sanderson, who was going to help his father run a boys' preparatory school at Elstree. They were probably the first Englishmen and non-sailors with whom Conrad struck up a friendship and he would remain in touch with both. In one of Galsworthy's first literary attempts, The Doldrums (1895–96), the protagonist—first mate Armand—is modelled after Conrad.

At Cape Town, where the Torrens remained from 17 to 19 May, Galsworthy left the ship to look at the local mines. Sanderson continued his voyage and seems to have been the first to develop closer ties with Conrad. Later that year, Conrad would visit his relatives in Poland and Ukraine once again.

=== Writer ===
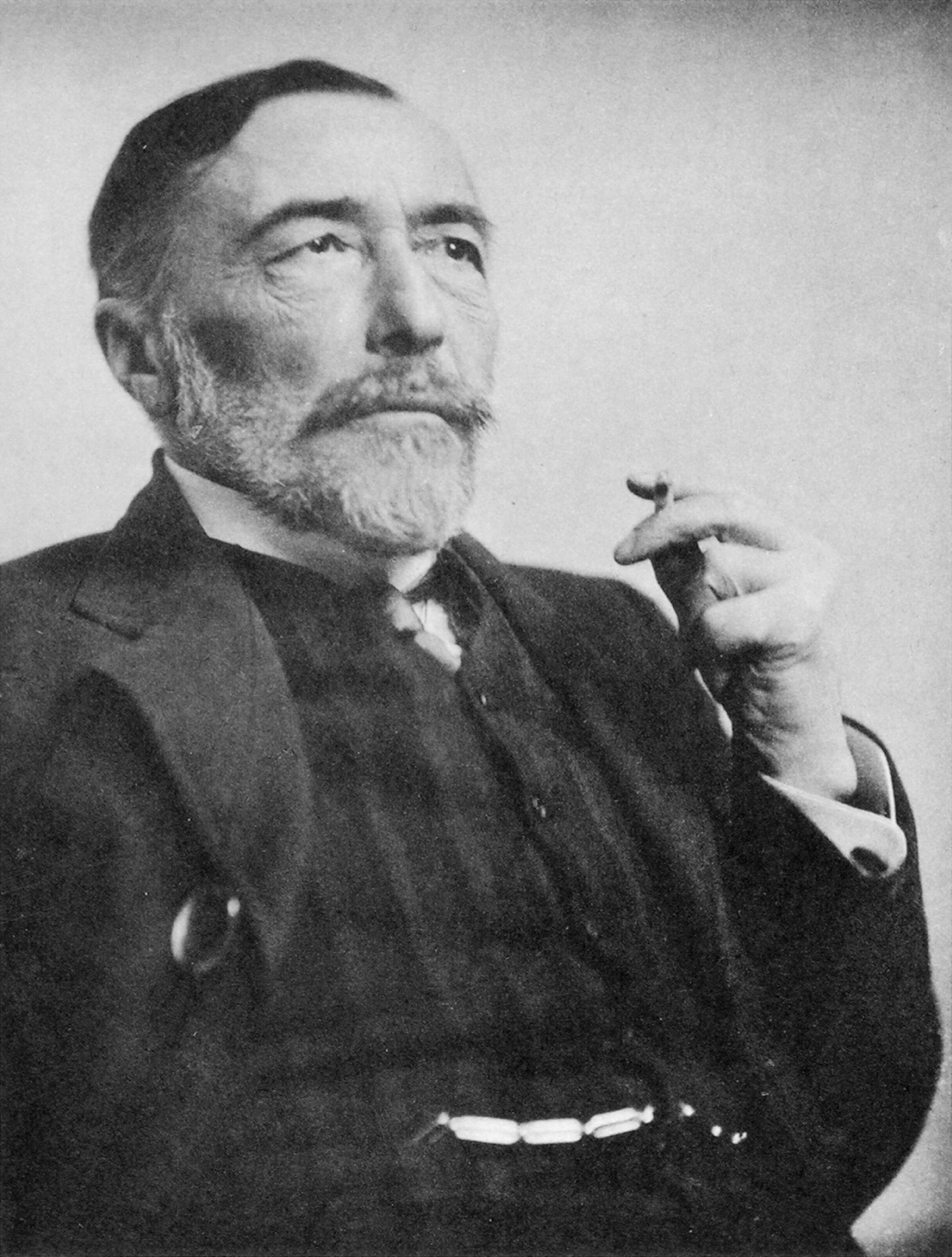
Conrad in 1916 (photo by Alvin Langdon Coburn)

In the autumn of 1889, Conrad began writing his first novel, Almayer's Folly.

[T]he son of a writer, praised by his [maternal] uncle [Tadeusz Bobrowski] for the beautiful style of his letters, the man who from the very first page showed a serious, professional approach to his work, presented his start on Almayer's Folly as a casual and non-binding incident... [Y]et he must have felt a pronounced need to write. Every page right from th[e] first one testifies that writing was not something he took up for amusement or to pass time. Just the contrary: it was a serious undertaking, supported by careful, diligent reading of the masters and aimed at shaping his own attitude to art and to reality.... [W]e do not know the sources of his artistic impulses and creative gifts.

Conrad's later letters to literary friends show the attention that he devoted to analysis of style, to individual words and expressions, to the emotional tone of phrases, to the atmosphere created by language. In this, Conrad in his own way followed the example of Gustave Flaubert, notorious for searching days on end for le mot juste—for the right word to render the "essence of the matter." Najder opined:

"[W]riting in a foreign language admits a greater temerity in tackling personally sensitive problems, for it leaves uncommitted the most spontaneous, deeper reaches of the psyche, and allows a greater distance in treating matters we would hardly dare approach in the language of our childhood. As a rule it is easier both to swear and to analyze dispassionately in an acquired language."

In 1894, aged 36, Conrad reluctantly gave up the sea, partly because of poor health, partly due to unavailability of ships, and partly because he had become so fascinated with writing that he had decided on a literary career. Almayer's Folly, set on the east coast of Borneo, was published in 1895. Its appearance marked his first use of the pen name "Joseph Conrad"; "Konrad" was, of course, the third of his Polish given names, but his use of it—in the anglicised version, "Conrad"—may also have been an homage to the Polish Romantic poet Adam Mickiewicz's patriotic narrative poem, Konrad Wallenrod.

Edward Garnett, a young publisher's reader and literary critic who would play one of the chief supporting roles in Conrad's literary career, had—like Unwin's first reader of Almayer's Folly, Wilfrid Hugh Chesson—been impressed by the manuscript, but Garnett had been "uncertain whether the English was good enough for publication." Garnett had shown the novel to his wife, Constance Garnett, later a translator of Russian literature. She had thought Conrad's foreignness a positive merit.

While Conrad had only limited personal acquaintance with the peoples of Maritime Southeast Asia, the region looms large in his early work. According to Najder, Conrad, the exile and wanderer, was aware of a difficulty that he confessed more than once: the lack of a common cultural background with his Anglophone readers meant he could not compete with English-language authors writing about the English-speaking world. At the same time, the choice of a non-English colonial setting freed him from an embarrassing division of loyalty: Almayer's Folly, and later "An Outpost of Progress" (1897, set in a Congo exploited by King Leopold II of Belgium) and Heart of Darkness (1899, likewise set in the Congo), contain bitter reflections on colonialism. The Malay states came theoretically under the suzerainty of the Dutch government; Conrad did not write about the area's British dependencies, which he never visited. He "was apparently intrigued by... struggles aimed at preserving national independence. The prolific and destructive richness of tropical nature and the dreariness of human life within it accorded well with the pessimistic mood of his early works." (Note: A comprehensive account of Conrad's Malay fiction is given by Robert Hampson.)

Almayer's Folly, together with its successor, An Outcast of the Islands (1896), laid the foundation for Conrad's reputation as a romantic teller of exotic tales—a misunderstanding of his purpose that was to frustrate him for the rest of his career. (Note: After The Mirror of the Sea was published on 4 October 1906 to good, sometimes enthusiastic reviews by critics and fellow writers, Conrad wrote to his French translator: "The critics have been vigorously swinging the censer to me.... Behind the concert of flattery, I can hear something like a whisper: 'Keep to the open sea! Don't land!' They want to banish me to the middle of the ocean.")

Almost all of Conrad's writings were first published in newspapers and magazines: influential reviews like The Fortnightly Review and the North American Review; avant-garde publications like the Savoy, New Review, and The English Review; popular short-fiction magazines like The Saturday Evening Post and Harper's Magazine; women's journals like the Pictorial Review and Romance; mass-circulation dailies like the Daily Mail and the New York Herald; and illustrated newspapers like The Illustrated London News and the Illustrated Buffalo Express. He also wrote for The Outlook, an imperialist weekly magazine, between 1898 and 1906. (Note: Serialization in periodicals, of installments often written from issue to issue, was standard practice for 19th- and early-20th-century novelists. It was done, for example, by Charles Dickens in England, and by Bolesław Prus in Poland.)

Financial success long eluded Conrad, who often requested advances from magazine and book publishers, and loans from acquaintances such as John Galsworthy. (Note: Najder argued that "three factors, national, personal, and social, converge[d] to exacerbate his financial difficulties: the traditional Polish impulse to cut a dash even if it means going into debt; the personal inability to economize; and the silent pressure to imitate the lifestyle of the [British] wealthy middle class to avoid being branded... a denizen of the abyss of poverty...") Eventually a government grant ("civil list pension") of £100 per annum, awarded on 9 August 1910, somewhat relieved his financial worries, (Note: Conrad renounced the grant in a 2 June 1917 letter to the Paymaster General.) and in time collectors began purchasing his manuscripts. Though his talent was early on recognised by English intellectuals, popular success eluded him until the 1913 publication of Chance, which is often considered one of his weaker novels.

=== Personal life ===
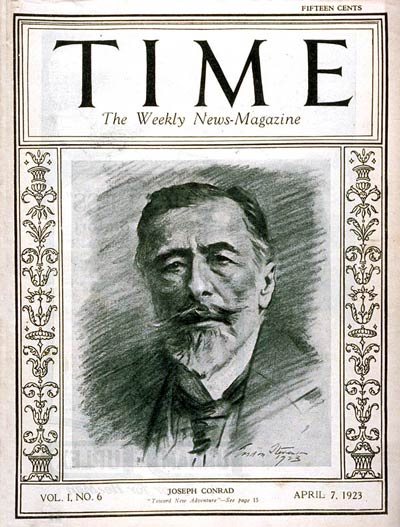
Time, 7 April 1923

==== Temperament and health ====
Conrad was a reserved man, wary of showing emotion. He scorned sentimentality; his manner of portraying emotion in his books was full of restraint, scepticism and irony. In the words of his uncle Bobrowski, as a young man Conrad was "extremely sensitive, conceited, reserved, and in addition excitable. In short [...] all the defects of the Nałęcz family."

Conrad suffered throughout life from ill health, physical and mental. A newspaper review of a Conrad biography suggested that the book could have been subtitled Thirty Years of Debt, Gout, Depression and Angst. In 1891 he was hospitalised for several months, suffering from gout, neuralgic pains in his right arm and recurrent attacks of malaria. He also complained of swollen hands "which made writing difficult". Taking his uncle Tadeusz Bobrowski's advice, he convalesced at a spa in Switzerland. Conrad had a phobia of dentistry, neglecting his teeth until they had to be extracted. In one letter he remarked that every novel he had written had cost him a tooth. Conrad's physical afflictions were, if anything, less vexatious than his mental ones. In his letters he often described symptoms of depression; "the evidence", writes Najder, "is so strong that it is nearly impossible to doubt it."

==== Attempted suicide ====
In March 1878, at the end of his Marseille period, 20-year-old Conrad attempted suicide, by shooting himself in the chest with a revolver. According to his uncle, who was summoned by a friend, Conrad had fallen into debt. Bobrowski described his subsequent "study" of his nephew in an extensive letter to Stefan Buszczyński, his own ideological opponent and a friend of Conrad's late father Apollo. (Note: "Although Konrad had been absolutely certain of accompanying Captain Escarras on his next voyage, the Bureau de l'Inscription forbade him to go on the grounds of his being a 21-year-old alien who was under the obligation of... military service in his own country. Then it was discovered... he had never had a permit from his [c]onsul—the ex-Inspector of the Port of Marseilles was summoned who... had [certified] the existence of such a permit—he was... reprimanded and nearly lost his job—which was undoubtedly very unpleasant for Konrad. The whole affair became... widely known, and all endeavors by... Captain [Escarras] and the ship-owner [Jean-Baptiste Delestang] proved fruitless... and Konrad was forced to stay behind with no hope of serving on French vessels. However, before all this happened another catastrophe—this time financial—befell him. While still in possession of the 3,000 fr[ancs] sent to him for the voyage, he met his former captain, Mr. Duteil, who persuaded him to participate in some enterprise on the coasts of Spain—some kind of contraband! He invested 1,000 fr[ancs] in it and made over 400, which pleased them greatly, so... on the second occasion he put in all he had—and lost the lot. ... Duteil... then went off to Buenos Aires. ... Konrad was left behind, unable to sign on for a ship—poor as a church mouse and, moreover, heavily in debt—for while speculating he had lived on credit... [H]e borrows 800 fr[ancs] from his [German] friend [Richard] Fecht and sets off for... Villefranche, where an American squadron was anchored,... inten[ding to] join... the American service. He achieves nothing there and, wishing to improve his finances, tries his luck in Monte Carlo and loses the 800 fr[ancs] he had borrowed. Having managed his affairs so excellently, he returns to Marseilles and one fine evening invites his friend the creditor [Fecht] to tea, for an appointed hour, and before his arrival attempts to take his life with a revolver. (Let this detail remain between us, as I have been telling everyone that he was wounded in a duel....) The bullet goes... through... near his heart without damaging any vital organ. Luckily, all his addresses were left on top of his things so that this worthy Mr. Fecht could instantly let me know... ... Apart from the 3,000 fr[ancs] which [Konrad] had lost, I had to pay as much again to settle his debts. Had he been my own son, I wouldn't have done it, but... in the case of my beloved sister's son, I had the weakness to act against [my] principles... Nevertheless, I swore that even if I knew that he would shoot himself a second time—there would be no repetition of the same weakness on my part. To some extent, also, I was influenced by considerations of our national honor, so that it should not be said that one of us had exploited the affection, which Konrad undoubtedly enjoyed, of all those with whom he came into contact.... My study of the Individual has convinced me that he is not a bad boy, only one who is extremely sensitive, conceited, reserved, and in addition excitable. In short, I found in him all the defects of the Nałęcz family. He is able and eloquent—he has forgotten nothing of his Polish although, since he left [Kraków], I was the first person he conversed with in his native tongue. He appears to know his profession well and to like it. [He declined Bobrowski's suggestion that he return to Poland, maintaining that he loved his profession.]...") To what extent the suicide attempt had been made in earnest likely will never be known, but it is suggestive of a situational depression.

==== Romance and marriage ====
In 1888 during a stop-over on Mauritius, in the Indian Ocean, Conrad developed a couple of romantic interests. One of these would be described in his 1910 story "A Smile of Fortune", which contains autobiographical elements (e.g., one of the characters is the same Chief Mate Burns who appears in The Shadow-Line). The narrator, a young captain, flirts ambiguously and surreptitiously with Alice Jacobus, daughter of a local merchant living in a house surrounded by a magnificent rose garden. Research has confirmed that in Port Louis at the time there was a 17-year-old Alice Shaw, whose father, a shipping agent, owned the only rose garden in town.

More is known about Conrad's other, more open flirtation. An old friend, Captain Gabriel Renouf of the French merchant marine, introduced him to the family of his brother-in-law. Renouf's eldest sister was the wife of Louis Edward Schmidt, a senior official in the colony; with them lived two other sisters and two brothers. Though the island had been taken over in 1810 by Britain, many of the inhabitants were descendants of the original French colonists, and Conrad's excellent French and perfect manners opened all local salons to him. He became a frequent guest at the Schmidts', where he often met the Misses Renouf. A couple of days before leaving Port Louis, Conrad asked one of the Renouf brothers for the hand of his 26-year-old sister Eugenie. She was already, however, engaged to marry her pharmacist cousin. After the rebuff, Conrad did not pay a farewell visit but sent a polite letter to Gabriel Renouf, saying he would never return to Mauritius and adding that on the day of the wedding his thoughts would be with them.

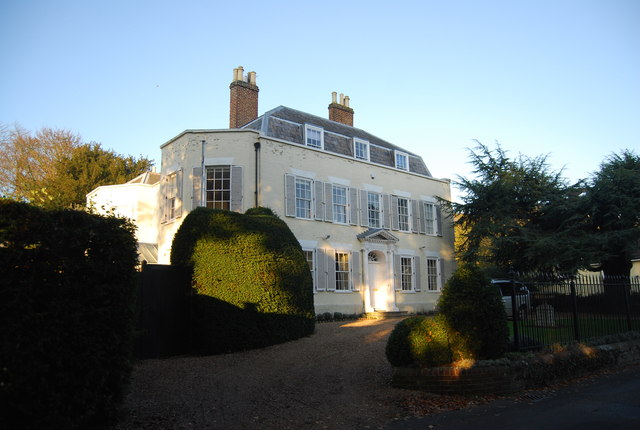
Westbere House, in Canterbury, Kent, was once owned by Conrad. It is listed Grade II on the National Heritage List for England.

On 24 March 1896 Conrad married an Englishwoman, Jessie George. The couple had two sons, Borys and John. The elder, Borys, proved a disappointment in scholarship and integrity. Jessie was an unsophisticated, working-class girl, sixteen years younger than Conrad. To his friends, she was an inexplicable choice of wife, and the subject of some rather disparaging and unkind remarks. (See Lady Ottoline Morrell's opinion of Jessie in Impressions.) However, according to other biographers such as Frederick Karl, Jessie provided what Conrad needed, namely a "straightforward, devoted, quite competent" companion. Similarly, Jones remarks that, despite whatever difficulties the marriage endured, "there can be no doubt that the relationship sustained Conrad's career as a writer", which might have been much less successful without her.

When in 1923 Jessie Conrad published A Handbook of Cookery for a Small House, it came with a preface from Joseph Conrad praising "the conscientious preparation of the simple food of everyday life, not the... concoction of idle feasts and rare dishes."

The couple rented a long series of successive homes, mostly in the English countryside. Conrad, who suffered frequent depressions, made great efforts to change his mood; the most important step was to move into another house. His frequent changes of home were usually signs of a search for psychological regeneration. Between 1910 and 1919 Conrad's home was Capel House in Orlestone, Kent, which was rented to him by Lord and Lady Oliver. It was here that he wrote The Rescue, Victory, and The Arrow of Gold.

Except for several vacations in France and Italy, a 1914 vacation in his native Poland, and a 1923 visit to the United States, Conrad lived the rest of his life in England.

=== Sojourn in Poland ===
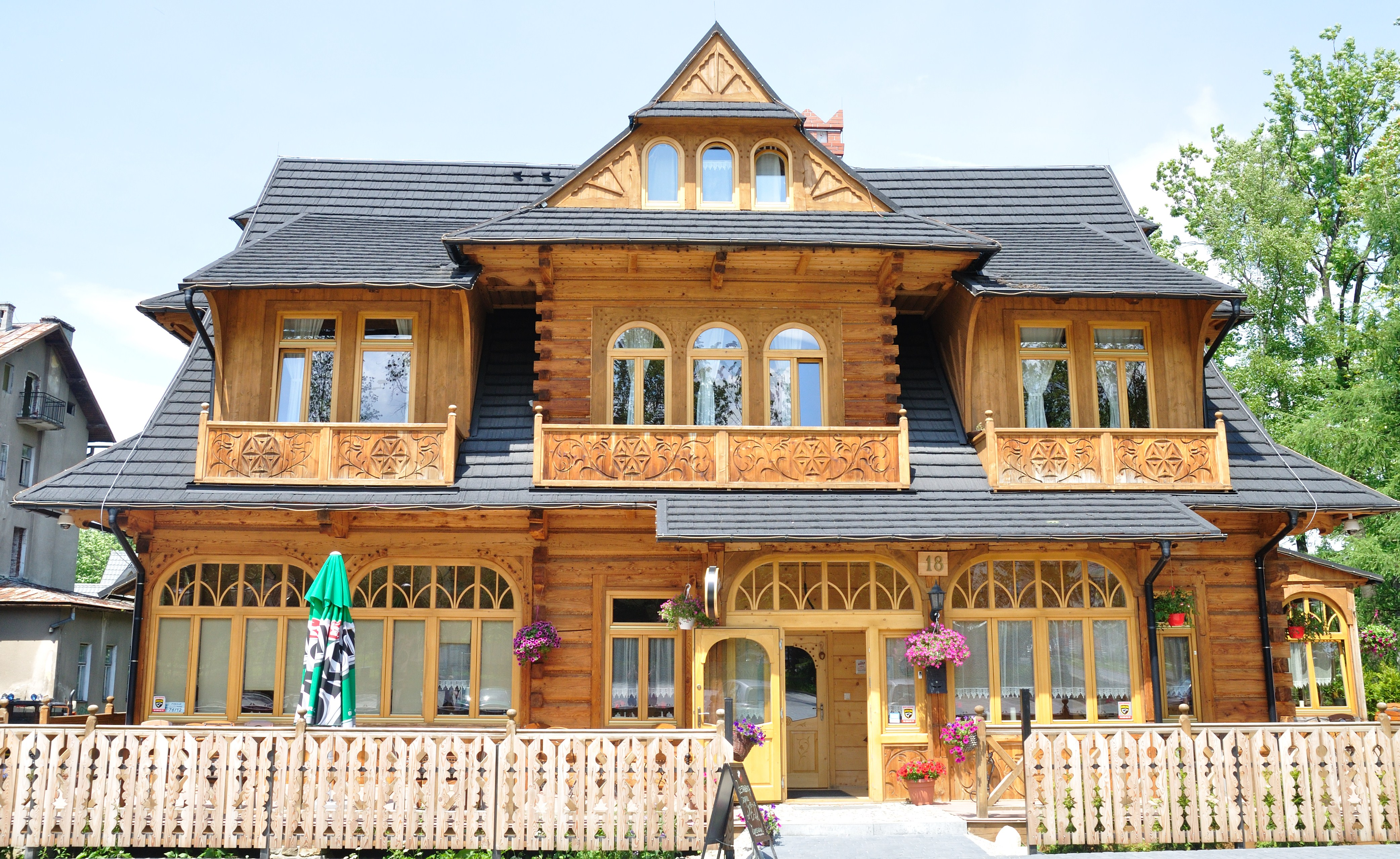
In 1914 Conrad and family stayed at the Zakopane Willa Konstantynówka, operated by his cousin Aniela Zagórska, mother of his future Polish translator of the same name.

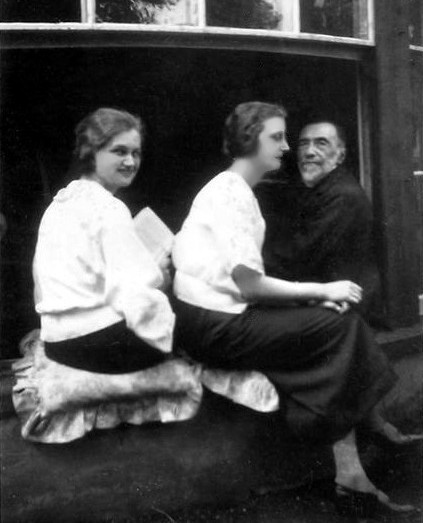
Conrad's nieces Aniela Zagórska (left), Karola Zagórska; Conrad

The 1914 vacation with his wife and sons in Poland, at the urging of Józef Retinger, coincided with the outbreak of World War I. On 28 July 1914, the day war broke out between Austria-Hungary and Serbia, Conrad and the Retingers arrived in Kraków (then in the Austro-Hungarian Empire), where Conrad visited childhood haunts.

As the city lay only a few miles from the Russian border, there was a risk of being stranded in a battle zone. With wife Jessie and younger son John ill, Conrad decided to take refuge in the mountain resort town of Zakopane. They left Kraków on 2 August. A few days after arrival in Zakopane, they moved to the Konstantynówka pension operated by Conrad's cousin Aniela Zagórska; it had been frequented by celebrities including the statesman Józef Piłsudski and Conrad's acquaintance, the young concert pianist Artur Rubinstein.

Zagórska introduced Conrad to Polish writers, intellectuals, and artists who had also taken refuge in Zakopane, including novelist Stefan Żeromski and Tadeusz Nalepiński, a writer friend of anthropologist Bronisław Malinowski. Conrad aroused interest among the Poles as a famous writer and an exotic compatriot from abroad. He charmed new acquaintances, especially women.

However, Marie Curie's physician sister, Bronisława Dłuska, wife of fellow physician and eminent socialist activist Kazimierz Dłuski, openly berated Conrad for having used his great talent for purposes other than bettering the future of his native land. (Note: Fifteen years earlier, in 1899, Conrad had been greatly upset when the novelist Eliza Orzeszkowa, responding to a misguided article by Wincenty Lutosławski, had expressed views similar to Dłuska's.) (Note: On another occasion, in a 14 February 1901 letter to his namesake Józef Korzeniowski, a librarian at Kraków's Jagiellonian University, Conrad had written, partly in reference to some Poles' accusation that he had deserted the Polish cause by writing in English: "It is widely known that I am a Pole and that Józef Konrad are my [given] names, the latter being used by me as a surname so that foreign mouths should not distort my real surname—a distortion which I cannot stand. It does not seem to me that I have been unfaithful to my country by having proved to the English that a gentleman from the Ukraine [Conrad had been born in a part of Ukraine that had belonged to Poland before 1793] can be as good a sailor as they, and has something to tell them in their own language.")

But thirty-two-year-old Aniela Zagórska (daughter of the pension keeper), Conrad's niece who would translate his works into Polish in 1923–39, idolised him, kept him company, and provided him with books. He particularly delighted in the stories and novels of the ten-years-older, recently deceased Bolesław Prus (who also had visited Zakopane), read everything by his fellow victim of Poland's 1863 Uprising—"my beloved Prus"—that he could get his hands on, and pronounced him "better than Dickens"—a favourite English novelist of Conrad's. (Note: Conrad's enthusiasm for Prus contrasted with his low regard for other Polish novelists of the time, including Eliza Orzeszkowa, Henryk Sienkiewicz, and Stefan Żeromski.)

Conrad, who was noted by his Polish acquaintances to still be fluent in his native tongue, participated in their impassioned political discussions. He declared presciently, as Józef Piłsudski had earlier in 1914 in Paris, that in the war, for Poland to regain independence, Russia must be beaten by the Central Powers (the Austro-Hungarian and German Empires), and the Central Powers must in turn be beaten by France and Britain. (Note: Soon after World War I, Conrad said of Piłsudski: "He was the only great man to emerge on the scene during the war." Conrad added: "In some aspects he is not unlike Napoleon, but as a type of man he is superior. Because Napoleon, his genius apart, was like all other people and Piłsudski is different.")

After many travails and vicissitudes, at the beginning of November 1914 Conrad managed to bring his family back to England. On his return, he was determined to work on swaying British opinion in favour of restoring Poland's sovereignty.

Jessie Conrad would later write in her memoirs: "I understood my husband so much better after those months in Poland. So many characteristics that had been strange and unfathomable to me before, took, as it were, their right proportions. I understood that his temperament was that of his countrymen."

=== Politics ===
Biographer Zdzisław Najder wrote:

Conrad was passionately concerned with politics. [This] is confirmed by several of his works, starting with Almayer's Folly. [...] Nostromo revealed his concern with these matters more fully; it was, of course, a concern quite natural for someone from a country [Poland] where politics was a matter not only of everyday existence but also of life and death. Moreover, Conrad himself came from a social class that claimed exclusive responsibility for state affairs, and from a very politically active family. Norman Douglas sums it up: "Conrad was first and foremost a Pole and like many Poles a politician and moralist malgré lui [French: "in spite of himself"]. These are his fundamentals." [What made] Conrad see political problems in terms of a continuous struggle between law and violence, anarchy and order, freedom and autocracy, material interests and the noble idealism of individuals [...] was Conrad's historical awareness. His Polish experience endowed him with the perception, exceptional in the Western European literature of his time, of how winding and constantly changing were the front lines in these struggles.

The most extensive and ambitious political statement that Conrad ever made was his 1905 essay, "Autocracy and War", whose starting point was the Russo-Japanese War (he finished the article a month before the Battle of Tsushima Strait). The essay begins with a statement about Russia's incurable weakness and ends with warnings against Prussia, the dangerous aggressor in a future European war. For Russia he predicted a violent outburst in the near future, but Russia's lack of democratic traditions and the backwardness of her masses made it impossible for the revolution to have a salutary effect. Conrad regarded the formation of a representative government in Russia as unfeasible and foresaw a transition from autocracy to dictatorship. He saw western Europe as torn by antagonisms engendered by economic rivalry and commercial selfishness. In vain might a Russian revolution seek advice or help from a materialistic and egoistic western Europe that armed itself in preparation for wars far more brutal than those of the past.

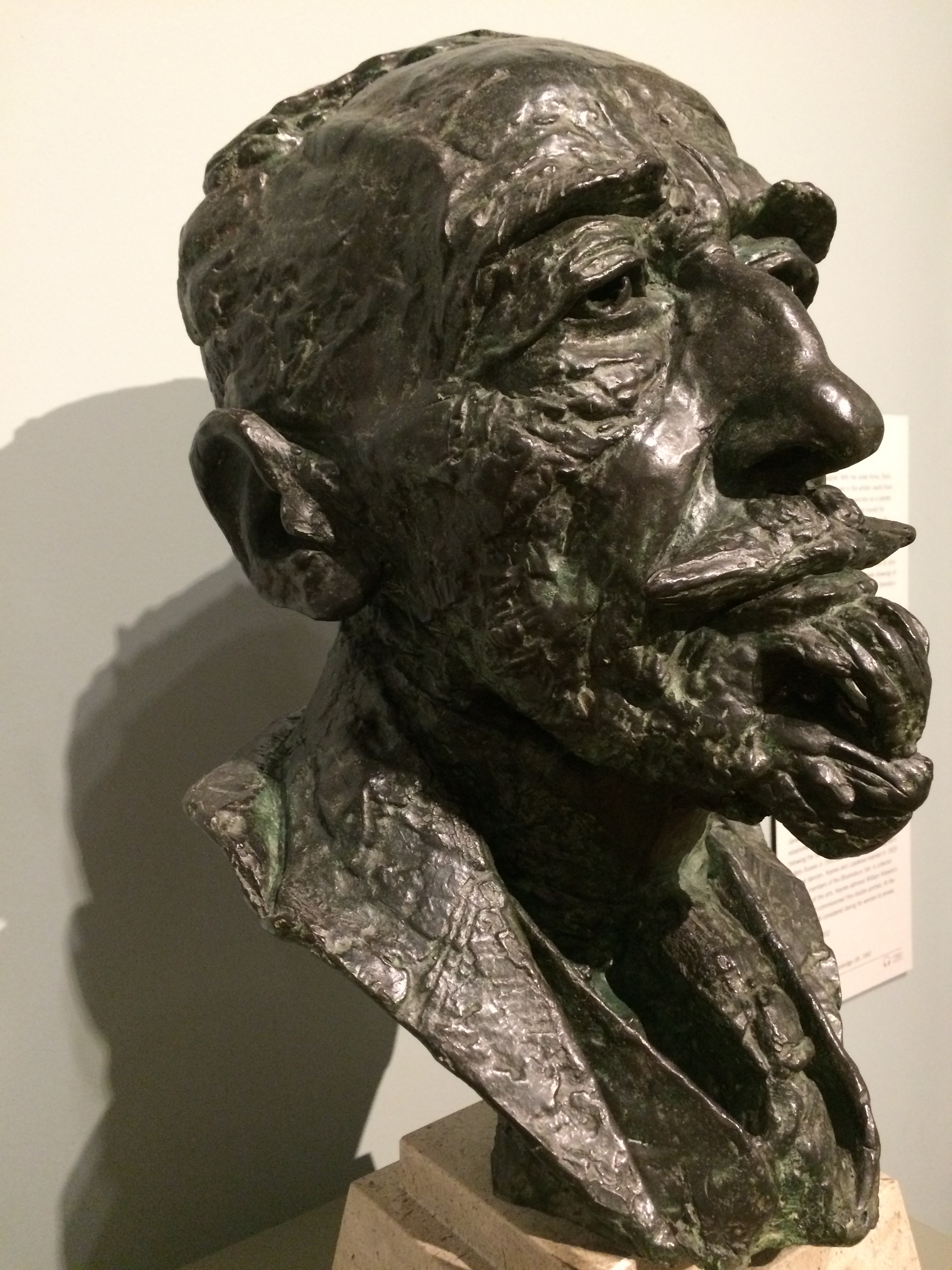
Conrad's bust by Jacob Epstein, 1924. Conrad called it "a wonderful piece of work of a somewhat monumental dignity, and yet—everybody agrees—the likeness is striking."

Conrad's distrust of democracy sprang from his doubts whether the propagation of democracy as an aim in itself could solve any problems. He thought that, in view of the weakness of human nature and of the "criminal" character of society, democracy offered boundless opportunities for demagogues and charlatans. Conrad kept his distance from partisan politics, and never voted in British national elections.

He accused social democrats of his time of acting to weaken "the national sentiment, the preservation of which [was his] concern"—of attempting to dissolve national identities in an impersonal melting-pot. "I look at the future from the depth of a very black past and I find that nothing is left for me except fidelity to a cause lost, to an idea without future." It was Conrad's hopeless fidelity to the memory of Poland that prevented him from believing in the idea of "international fraternity", which he considered, under the circumstances, just a verbal exercise. He resented some socialists' talk of freedom and world brotherhood while keeping silent about his own partitioned and oppressed Poland.

Before that, in the early 1880s, letters to Conrad from his uncle Tadeusz (Note: Conrad's own letters to his uncle in Ukraine, writes Najder, were destroyed during World War I.) show Conrad apparently having hoped for an improvement in Poland's situation not through a liberation movement but by establishing an alliance with neighbouring Slavic nations. This had been accompanied by a faith in the Panslavic ideology—"surprising", Najder writes, "in a man who was later to emphasize his hostility towards Russia, a conviction that... Poland's [superior] civilization and... historic... traditions would [let] her play a leading role... in the Panslavic community, [and his] doubts about Poland's chances of becoming a fully sovereign nation-state."

Conrad's alienation from partisan politics went together with an abiding sense of the thinking man's burden imposed by his personality, as described in an 1894 letter by Conrad to a relative-by-marriage and fellow author, Marguerite Poradowska (née Gachet, and cousin of Vincent van Gogh's physician, Paul Gachet) of Brussels:

We must drag the chain and ball of our personality to the end. This is the price one pays for the infernal and divine privilege of thought; so in this life it is only the chosen who are convicts—a glorious band which understands and groans but which treads the earth amidst a multitude of phantoms with maniacal gestures and idiotic grimaces. Which would you rather be: idiot or convict?

Conrad wrote H. G. Wells that the latter's 1901 book, Anticipations, an ambitious attempt to predict major social trends, "seems to presuppose... a sort of select circle to which you address yourself, leaving the rest of the world outside the pale. [In addition,] you do not take sufficient account of human imbecility which is cunning and perfidious." (Note: In a second edition of Anticipations (1902), Wells included a note at the end of chapter 1 acknowledging a suggestion regarding "the possibility (which my friend Mr. Joseph Conrad has suggested to me) of sliding cars along practically frictionless rails.")

In a 23 October 1922 letter to mathematician-philosopher Bertrand Russell, in response to the latter's book, The Problem of China, which advocated socialist reforms and an oligarchy of sages who would reshape Chinese society, Conrad explained his own distrust of political panaceas:

I have never [found] in any man's book or... talk anything... to stand up... against my deep-seated sense of fatality governing this man-inhabited world.... The only remedy for Chinamen and for the rest of us is [a] change of hearts, but looking at the history of the last 2000 years there is not much reason to expect [it], even if man has taken to flying—a great "uplift" no doubt but no great change....

Leo Robson writes:

Conrad... adopted a broader ironic stance—a sort of blanket incredulity, defined by a character in Under Western Eyes as the negation of all faith, devotion, and action. Through control of tone and narrative detail... Conrad exposes what he considered to be the naïveté of movements like anarchism and socialism, and the self-serving logic of such historical but "naturalized" phenomena as capitalism (piracy with good PR), rationalism (an elaborate defense against our innate irrationality), and imperialism (a grandiose front for old-school rape and pillage). To be ironic is to be awake—and alert to the prevailing "somnolence." In Nostromo... the journalist Martin Decoud... ridicul[es] the idea that people "believe themselves to be influencing the fate of the universe." (H. G. Wells recalled Conrad's astonishment that "I could take social and political issues seriously.")

But, writes Robson, Conrad is no moral nihilist:

If irony exists to suggest that there's more to things than meets the eye, Conrad further insists that, when we pay close enough attention, the "more" can be endless. He doesn't reject what [his character] Marlow [introduced in Youth] calls "the haggard utilitarian lies of our civilisation" in favor of nothing; he rejects them in favor of "something", "some saving truth", "some exorcism against the ghost of doubt"—an intimation of a deeper order, one not easily reduced to words. Authentic, self-aware emotion—feeling that doesn't call itself "theory" or "wisdom"—becomes a kind of standard-bearer, with "impressions" or "sensations" the nearest you get to solid proof.

In an August 1901 letter to the editor of The New York Times Saturday Book Review, Conrad wrote: "Egoism, which is the moving force of the world, and altruism, which is its morality, these two contradictory instincts, of which one is so plain and the other so mysterious, cannot serve us unless in the incomprehensible alliance of their irreconcilable antagonism." (Note: This may have been Conrad's central insight that so enthralled Lady Ottoline Morrell and Bertrand Russell (see "Impressions").)

=== Death ===
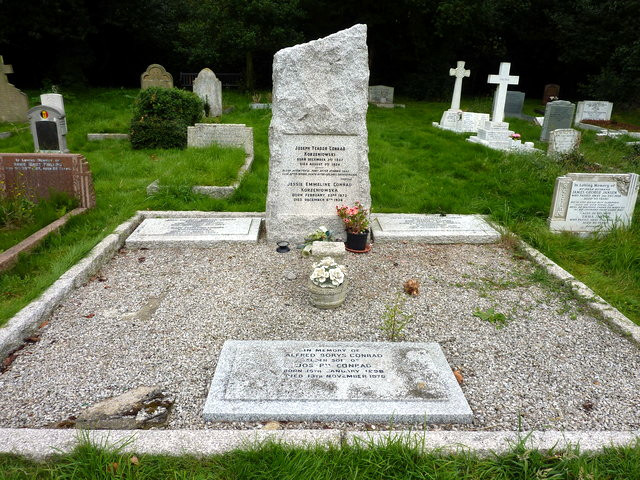
Conrad's grave at Canterbury Cemetery, near Harbledown, Kent

On 3 August 1924, Conrad died at his house, Oswalds, in Bishopsbourne, Kent, England, probably of a heart attack. He was interred at Canterbury Cemetery, Canterbury, under a misspelled version of his original Polish name, as "Joseph Teador Conrad Korzeniowski". Inscribed on his gravestone are the lines from Edmund Spenser's The Faerie Queene which he had chosen as the epigraph to his last complete novel, The Rover:

Sleep after toyle, port after stormie seas,
Ease after warre, death after life, doth greatly please

Conrad's modest funeral took place amid great crowds. His old friend Edward Garnett recalled bitterly:

To those who attended Conrad's funeral in Canterbury during the Cricket Festival of 1924, and drove through the crowded streets festooned with flags, there was something symbolical in England's hospitality and in the crowd's ignorance of even the existence of this great writer. A few old friends, acquaintances and pressmen stood by his grave.

Another old friend of Conrad's, Cunninghame Graham, wrote Garnett: "Aubry was saying to me... that had Anatole France died, all Paris would have been at his funeral."

Conrad's wife Jessie died twelve years later, on 6 December 1936, and was interred with him.

In 1996 his grave was designated a Grade II listed structure.

Conrad, though nominally a Catholic, is described by biographer Jeffrey Meyers as having been an atheist.

== Writing style ==
=== Themes and style ===
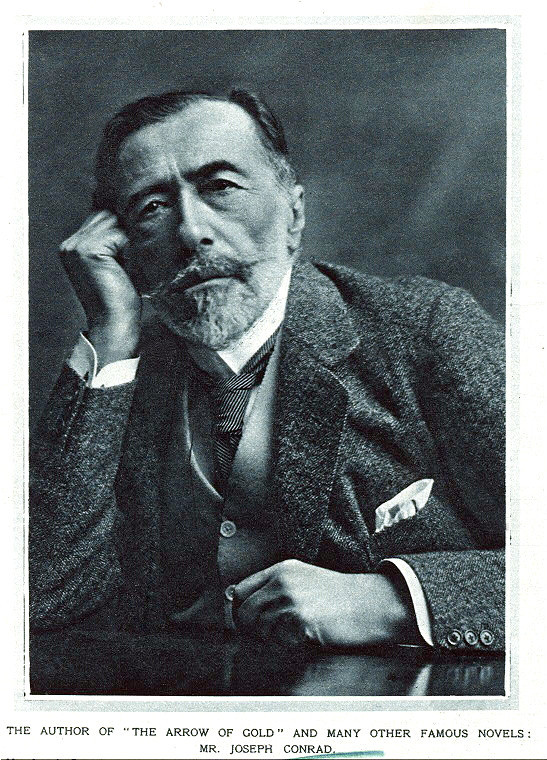
Conrad, 1919 or after

Despite the opinions even of some who knew Conrad personally, such as fellow-novelist Henry James, Conrad—even when only writing elegantly crafted letters to his uncle and acquaintances—was always at heart a writer who sailed, rather than a sailor who wrote. He used his sailing experiences as a backdrop for many of his works, but he also produced works of similar world view, without the nautical motifs. The failure of many critics to appreciate this caused him much frustration.

He wrote more often about life at sea and in exotic parts than about life on British land because—unlike, for example, his friend John Galsworthy, author of The Forsyte Saga—he knew little about everyday domestic relations in Britain. When Conrad's The Mirror of the Sea was published in 1906 to critical acclaim, he wrote to his French translator: "The critics have been vigorously swinging the censer to me. ... Behind the concert of flattery, I can hear something like a whisper: 'Keep to the open sea! Don't land!' They want to banish me to the middle of the ocean." Writing to his friend Richard Curle, Conrad remarked that "the public mind fastens on externals" such as his "sea life", oblivious to how authors transform their material "from particular to general, and appeal to universal emotions by the temperamental handling of personal experience".

Nevertheless, Conrad found much sympathetic readership, especially in the United States. H. L. Mencken was one of the earliest and most influential American readers to recognise how Conrad conjured up "the general out of the particular". F. Scott Fitzgerald, writing to Mencken, complained about having been omitted from a list of Conrad imitators. Since Fitzgerald, dozens of other American writers have acknowledged their debts to Conrad, including William Faulkner, William Burroughs, Saul Bellow, Philip Roth, Joan Didion, and Thomas Pynchon.

An October 1923 visitor to Oswalds, Conrad's home at the time—Cyril Clemens, a cousin of Mark Twain—quoted Conrad as saying: "In everything I have written there is always one invariable intention, and that is to capture the reader's attention."

Conrad the artist famously aspired, in the words of his preface to The Nigger of the 'Narcissus' (1897), "by the power of the written word to make you hear, to make you feel ... before all, to make you see. That—and no more, and it is everything. If I succeed, you shall find there according to your deserts: encouragement, consolation, fear, charm—all you demand—and, perhaps, also that glimpse of truth for which you have forgotten to ask."

Writing in what to the visual arts was the age of Impressionism, and what to music was the age of impressionist music, Conrad showed himself in many of his works a prose poet of the highest order: for instance, in the evocative Patna and courtroom scenes of Lord Jim; in the scenes of the "melancholy-mad elephant" (Note: Conrad's simile of an elephant in a state of melancholy madness may be an example of his use, without conscious plagiaristic intent, of an image remembered from another writer's work, in this case from Charles Dickens' 1854 novel Hard Times, part 1, chapter 5: "the piston of the steam-engine worked monotonously up and down, like the head of an elephant in a state of melancholy madness.") and the "French gunboat firing into a continent", in Heart of Darkness; in the doubled protagonists of "The Secret Sharer"; and in the verbal and conceptual resonances of Nostromo and The Nigger of the 'Narcissus'.

Conrad used his own memories as literary material so often that readers are tempted to treat his life and work as a single whole. His "view of the world", or elements of it, is often described by citing at once both his private and public statements, passages from his letters, and citations from his books. Najder warns that this approach produces an incoherent and misleading picture. "An ... uncritical linking of the two spheres, literature and private life, distorts each. Conrad used his own experiences as raw material, but the finished product should not be confused with the experiences themselves."

Many of Conrad's characters were inspired by actual persons he had met, including, in his first novel, Almayer's Folly (completed 1894), William Charles Olmeijer, the spelling of whose surname Conrad probably altered to "Almayer" inadvertently. The historic trader Olmeijer, whom Conrad encountered on his four short visits to Berau in Borneo, subsequently haunted Conrad's imagination. Conrad often borrowed the authentic names of actual individuals, e.g., Captain McWhirr (Note: Conrad had sailed in 1887 on the Highland Forest under Captain John McWhir, a 34-year-old Irishman. In Typhoon, Conrad gave the same name, with an additional r, to the much older master of the Nan-Shan.) (Typhoon), Captain Beard and Mr. Mahon ("Youth"), Captain Lingard (Almayer's Folly and elsewhere), and Captain Ellis (The Shadow-Line). "Conrad", writes J. I. M. Stewart, "appears to have attached some mysterious significance to such links with actuality." Equally curious is "a great deal of namelessness in Conrad, requiring some minor virtuosity to maintain." Thus we never learn the surname of the protagonist of Lord Jim. In Heart of Darkness, among "nameless characters, chapters, rivers, rites and landscapes", "Marlow and Kurtz are the only living persons introduced with a proper name". Conrad also preserves, in The Nigger of the 'Narcissus', the authentic name of the ship, the Narcissus, in which he sailed in 1884.

Apart from Conrad's own experiences, a number of episodes in his fiction were suggested by past or contemporary publicly known events or literary works. The first half of the 1900 novel Lord Jim (the Patna episode) was inspired by the real-life 1880 story of the SS Jeddah; the second part, to some extent by the life of James Brooke, the first White Rajah of Sarawak. The 1901 short story "Amy Foster" was inspired partly by an anecdote in Ford Madox Ford's The Cinque Ports (1900), wherein a shipwrecked sailor from a German merchant ship, unable to communicate in English, and driven away by the local country people, finally found shelter in a pigsty. (Note: Another inspiration for "Amy Foster" likely was an incident in France in 1896 when, as his wife Jessie recalled, Conrad "raved ... speaking only in his native tongue and betraying no knowledge of who I might be. For hours I remained by his side watching the feverish glitter of his eyes that seemed fixed on some object outside my vision, and listening to the meaningless phrases and lengthy speeches, not a word of which I could understand. ... All that night Joseph Conrad continued to rave in Polish, a habit he kept up every time any illness had him in its grip.")

In Nostromo (completed 1904), the theft of a massive consignment of silver was suggested to Conrad by a story he had heard in the Gulf of Mexico and later read about in a "volume picked up outside a second-hand bookshop." (Note: The book was Frederick Benton Williams' On Many Seas: The Life and Exploits of a Yankee Sailor (1897).) The novel's political strand, according to Maya Jasanoff, is related to the creation of the Panama Canal. "In January 1903", she writes, "just as Conrad started writing Nostromo, the US and Colombian secretaries of state signed a treaty granting the United States a one-hundred-year renewable lease on a six-mile strip flanking the canal ... While the [news]papers murmured about revolution in Colombia, Conrad opened a fresh section of Nostromo with hints of dissent in Costaguana", his fictional South American country. He plotted a revolution in the Costaguanan fictional port of Sulaco that mirrored the real-life secessionist movement brewing in Panama. When Conrad finished the novel on 1 September 1904, writes Jasanoff, "he left Sulaco in the condition of Panama. As Panama had gotten its independence instantly recognized by the United States and its economy bolstered by American investment in the canal, so Sulaco had its independence instantly recognized by the United States, and its economy underwritten by investment in the [fictional] San Tomé [silver] mine."

The Secret Agent (completed 1906) was inspired by the French anarchist Martial Bourdin's 1894 death while apparently attempting to blow up the Greenwich Observatory. Conrad's story "The Secret Sharer" (completed 1909) was inspired by an 1880 incident when Sydney Smith, first mate of the Cutty Sark, had killed a seaman and fled from justice, aided by the ship's captain. The plot of Under Western Eyes (completed 1910) is kicked off by the assassination of a brutal Russian government minister, modelled after the real-life 1904 assassination of Russian Minister of the Interior Vyacheslav von Plehve. The near-novella "Freya of the Seven Isles" (completed in March 1911) was inspired by a story told to Conrad by a Malaya old hand and fan of Conrad's, Captain Carlos M. Marris.

For the natural surroundings of the high seas, the Malay Archipelago and South America, which Conrad described so vividly, he could rely on his own observations. What his brief landfalls could not provide was a thorough understanding of exotic cultures. For this he resorted, like other writers, to literary sources. When writing his Malayan stories, he consulted Alfred Russel Wallace's The Malay Archipelago (1869), James Brooke's journals, and books with titles like Perak and the Malays, My Journal in Malayan Waters, and Life in the Forests of the Far East. When he set about writing his novel Nostromo, set in the fictional South American country of Costaguana, he turned to The War between Peru and Chile; Edward Eastwick, Venezuela: or, Sketches of Life in a South American Republic (1868); and George Frederick Masterman, Seven Eventful Years in Paraguay (1869). (Note: In Nostromo, echoes can also be heard of Alexandre Dumas' biography of Garibaldi, who had fought in South America.) As a result of relying on literary sources, in Lord Jim, as J. I. M. Stewart writes, Conrad's "need to work to some extent from second-hand" led to "a certain thinness in Jim's relations with the ... peoples ... of Patusan..." This prompted Conrad at some points to alter the nature of Charles Marlow's narrative to "distanc[e] an uncertain command of the detail of Tuan Jim's empire."

In keeping with his scepticism and melancholy, Conrad almost invariably gives lethal fates to the characters in his principal novels and stories. Almayer (Almayer's Folly, 1894), abandoned by his beloved daughter, takes to opium, and dies. Peter Willems (An Outcast of the Islands, 1895) is killed by his jealous lover Aïssa. The ineffectual "Nigger", James Wait (The Nigger of the 'Narcissus', 1897), dies aboard ship and is buried at sea. Mr. Kurtz (Heart of Darkness, 1899) expires, uttering the words, "The horror! The horror!" Tuan Jim (Lord Jim, 1900), having inadvertently precipitated a massacre of his adoptive community, deliberately walks to his death at the hands of the community's leader. In Conrad's 1901 short story, "Amy Foster", a Pole transplanted to England, Yanko Goorall (an English transliteration of the Polish Janko Góral, "Johnny Highlander"), falls ill and, suffering from a fever, raves in his native language, frightening his wife Amy, who flees; next morning Yanko dies of heart failure, and it transpires that he had simply been asking in Polish for water. (Note: Conrad's wife Jessie wrote that, during Conrad's malaria attack on their honeymoon in France in 1896, he "raved ... speaking only in his native tongue and betraying no knowledge of who I might be. For hours I remained by his side watching the feverish glitter of his eyes ... and listening to the meaningless phrases and lengthy speeches, not a word of which I could understand.") Captain Whalley (The End of the Tether, 1902), betrayed by failing eyesight and an unscrupulous partner, drowns himself. Gian' Battista Fidanza, (Note: Fidanza is an Italian expression for "fidelity".) the eponymous respected Italian-immigrant Nostromo (Italian: "Our Man") of the novel Nostromo (1904), illicitly obtains a treasure of silver mined in the South American country of "Costaguana" and is shot dead due to mistaken identity. Mr. Verloc, The Secret Agent (1906) of divided loyalties, attempts a bombing, to be blamed on terrorists, that accidentally kills his mentally defective brother-in-law Stevie, and Verloc himself is killed by his distraught wife, who drowns herself by jumping overboard from a channel steamer. In Chance (1913), Roderick Anthony, a sailing-ship captain, and benefactor and husband of Flora de Barral, becomes the target of a poisoning attempt by her jealous disgraced financier father who, when detected, swallows the poison himself and dies (some years later, Captain Anthony drowns at sea). In Victory (1915), Lena is shot dead by Jones, who had meant to kill his accomplice Ricardo and later succeeds in doing so, then himself perishes along with another accomplice, after which Lena's protector Axel Heyst sets fire to his bungalow and dies beside Lena's body.

When a principal character of Conrad's does escape with his life, he sometimes does not fare much better. In Under Western Eyes (1911), Razumov betrays a fellow University of St. Petersburg student, the revolutionist Victor Haldin, who has assassinated a savagely repressive Russian government minister. Haldin is tortured and hanged by the authorities. Later Razumov, sent as a government spy to Geneva, a centre of anti-tsarist intrigue, meets the mother and sister of Haldin, who share Haldin's liberal convictions. Razumov falls in love with the sister and confesses his betrayal of her brother; later, he makes the same avowal to assembled revolutionists, and their professional executioner bursts his eardrums, making him deaf for life. Razumov staggers away, is knocked down by a streetcar, and finally returns as a cripple to Russia.

Conrad was keenly conscious of tragedy in the world and in his works. In 1898, at the start of his writing career, he had written to his Scottish writer-politician friend Cunninghame Graham: "What makes mankind tragic is not that they are the victims of nature, it is that they are conscious of it. [A]s soon as you know of your slavery the pain, the anger, the strife—the tragedy begins." But in 1922, near the end of his life and career, when another Scottish friend, Richard Curle, sent Conrad proofs of two articles he had written about Conrad, the latter objected to being characterised as a gloomy and tragic writer. "That reputation ... has deprived me of innumerable readers ... I absolutely object to being called a tragedian."

Conrad claimed that he "never kept a diary and never owned a notebook." John Galsworthy, who knew him well, described this as "a statement which surprised no one who knew the resources of his memory and the brooding nature of his creative spirit." Nevertheless, after Conrad's death, Richard Curle published a heavily modified version of Conrad's diaries describing his experiences in the Congo; in 1978 a more complete version was published as The Congo Diary and Other Uncollected Pieces. The first accurate transcription was published in Robert Hampson's Penguin edition of Heart of Darkness in 1995; Hampson's transcription and annotations were reprinted in the Penguin edition of 2007.

Unlike many authors who make it a point not to discuss work in progress, Conrad often did discuss his current work and even showed it to select friends and fellow authors, such as Edward Garnett, and sometimes modified it in the light of their critiques and suggestions. Conrad frequently suffered from writer's block.

Edward Said was struck by the sheer quantity of Conrad's correspondence with friends and fellow writers; by 1966, it "amount[ed] to eight published volumes". Said comments: "[I]t seemed to me that if Conrad wrote of himself, of the problem of self-definition, with such sustained urgency, some of what he wrote must have had meaning for his fiction. [I]t [was] difficult to believe that a man would be so uneconomical as to pour himself out in letter after letter and then not use and reformulate his insights and discoveries in his fiction." Said found especially close parallels between Conrad's letters and his shorter fiction. "Conrad ... believed ... that artistic distinction was more tellingly demonstrated in a shorter rather than a longer work.... He believed that his [own] life was like a series of short episodes... because he was himself so many different people ...: he was a Pole (Note: Conrad was a trilingual Pole: Polish-, French-, and English-speaking.) and an Englishman, a sailor and a writer." Another scholar, Najder, wrote:

Throughout almost his entire life Conrad was an outsider and felt himself to be one. An outsider in exile; an outsider during his visits to his family in the Ukraine; an outsider—because of his experiences and bereavement—in [Kraków] and Lwów; an outsider in Marseilles; an outsider, nationally and culturally, on British ships; an outsider as an English writer. ... Conrad called himself (to Graham) a "bloody foreigner." At the same time ... [h]e regarded "the national spirit" as the only truly permanent and reliable element of communal life.

Conrad borrowed from other, Polish- and French-language authors, to an extent sometimes skirting plagiarism. When the Polish translation of his 1915 novel Victory appeared in 1931, readers noted striking similarities to Stefan Żeromski's kitschy novel, The History of a Sin (Dzieje grzechu, 1908), including their endings. Comparative-literature scholar Yves Hervouet has demonstrated in the text of Victory a whole mosaic of influences, borrowings, similarities and allusions. He further lists hundreds of concrete borrowings from other, mostly French authors in nearly all of Conrad's works, from Almayer's Folly (1895) to his unfinished Suspense. Conrad seems to have used eminent writers' texts as raw material of the same kind as the content of his own memory. Materials borrowed from other authors often functioned as allusions. Moreover, he had a phenomenal memory for texts and remembered details, "but [writes Najder] it was not a memory strictly categorized according to sources, marshalled into homogeneous entities; it was, rather, an enormous receptacle of images and pieces from which he would draw."

Continues Najder: "[H]e can never be accused of outright plagiarism. Even when lifting sentences and scenes, Conrad changed their character, inserted them within novel structures. He did not imitate, but (as Hervouet says) 'continued' his masters. He was right in saying: 'I don't resemble anybody.' Ian Watt put it succinctly: 'In a sense, Conrad is the least derivative of writers; he wrote very little that could possibly be mistaken for the work of anyone else.' Conrad's acquaintance George Bernard Shaw says it well: "[A] man can no more be completely original [...] than a tree can grow out of air."

Conrad, like other artists, faced constraints arising from the need to propitiate his audience and confirm their own favourable self-regard. This may account for his describing the admirable crew of the Judea in his 1898 story "Youth" as "Liverpool hard cases", whereas the crew of the Judea's actual 1882 prototype, the Palestine, had included not a single Liverpudlian, and half the crew had been non-Britons; and for Conrad's transforming the real-life 1880 criminally negligent British captain J. L. Clark, of the SS Jeddah, in his 1900 novel Lord Jim, into the captain of the fictitious Patna—"a sort of renegade New South Wales German" so monstrous in physical appearance as to suggest "a trained baby elephant". Similarly, in his letters Conrad—during most of his literary career, struggling for sheer financial survival—often adjusted his views to the predilections of his correspondents. Historians have also noted that Conrad's works which were set in European colonies and intended to critique the effects of colonialism were set in Dutch and Belgian colonies, instead of the British Empire.

The singularity of the universe depicted in Conrad's novels, especially compared to those of near-contemporaries like his friend and frequent benefactor John Galsworthy, is such as to open him to criticism similar to that later applied to Graham Greene. But where "Greeneland" has been characterised as a recurring and recognisable atmosphere independent of setting, Conrad is at pains to create a sense of place, be it aboard ship or in a remote village; often he chose to have his characters play out their destinies in isolated or confined circumstances. In the view of Evelyn Waugh and Kingsley Amis, it was not until the first volumes of Anthony Powell's sequence, A Dance to the Music of Time, were published in the 1950s, that an English novelist achieved the same command of atmosphere and precision of language with consistency, a view supported by later critics like A. N. Wilson; Powell acknowledged his debt to Conrad. Leo Gurko, too, remarks, as "one of Conrad's special qualities, his abnormal awareness of place, an awareness magnified to almost a new dimension in art, an ecological dimension defining the relationship between earth and man."

T. E. Lawrence, one of many writers whom Conrad befriended, offered some perceptive observations about Conrad's writing:

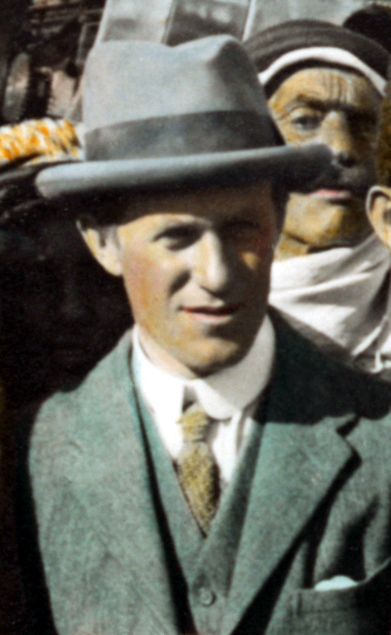
T. E. Lawrence, whom Conrad befriended

He's absolutely the most haunting thing in prose that ever was: I wish I knew how every paragraph he writes (... they are all paragraphs: he seldom writes a single sentence ...) goes on sounding in waves, like the note of a tenor bell, after it stops. It's not built in the rhythm of ordinary prose, but on something existing only in his head, and as he can never say what it is he wants to say, all his things end in a kind of hunger, a suggestion of something he can't say or do or think. So his books always look bigger than they are. He's as much a giant of the subjective as Kipling is of the objective. Do they hate one another?

The Irish novelist-poet-critic Colm Tóibín captures something similar:

Joseph Conrad's heroes were often alone, and close to hostility and danger. Sometimes, when Conrad's imagination was at its most fertile and his command of English at its most precise, the danger came darkly from within the self. At other times, however, it came from what could not be named. Conrad sought then to evoke rather than delineate, using something close to the language of prayer. While his imagination was content at times with the tiny, vivid, perfectly observed detail, it was also nourished by the need to suggest and symbolize. Like a poet, he often left the space in between strangely, alluringly vacant.

His own vague terms—words like "ineffable", "infinite", "mysterious", "unknowable"—were as close as he could come to a sense of our fate in the world or the essence of the universe, a sense that reached beyond the time he described and beyond his characters' circumstances. This idea of "beyond" satisfied something in his imagination. He worked as though between the intricate systems of a ship and the vague horizon of a vast sea.

This irreconcilable distance between what was precise and what was shimmering made him much more than a novelist of adventure, a chronicler of the issues that haunted his time, or a writer who dramatized moral questions. This left him open to interpretation—and indeed to attack [by critics such as the novelists V.S. Naipaul and Chinua Achebe].

In a letter of 14 December 1897 to his Scottish friend, Robert Bontine Cunninghame Graham, Conrad wrote that science tells us, "Understand that thou art nothing, less than a shadow, more insignificant than a drop of water in the ocean, more fleeting than the illusion of a dream."

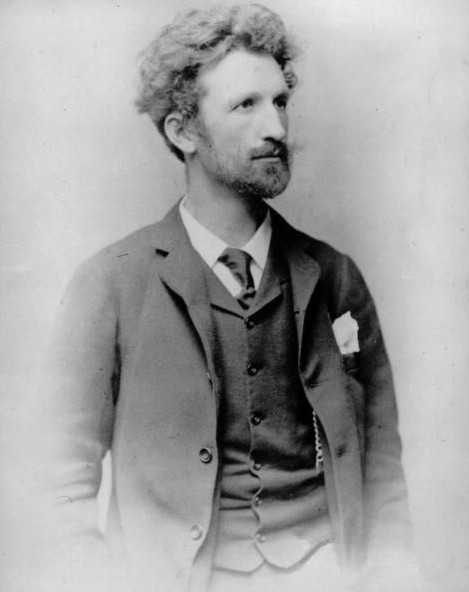
Conrad's friend Cunninghame Graham

In a letter of 20 December 1897 to Cunninghame Graham, Conrad metaphorically described the universe as a huge machine:

It evolved itself (I am severely scientific) out of a chaos of scraps of iron and behold!—it knits. I am horrified at the horrible work and stand appalled. I feel it ought to embroider—but it goes on knitting. You come and say: "this is all right; it's only a question of the right kind of oil. Let us use this—for instance—celestial oil and the machine shall embroider a most beautiful design in purple and gold." Will it? Alas no. You cannot by any special lubrication make embroidery with a knitting machine. And the most withering thought is that the infamous thing has made itself; made itself without thought, without conscience, without foresight, without eyes, without heart. It is a tragic accident—and it has happened. You can't interfere with it. The last drop of bitterness is in the suspicion that you can't even smash it. In virtue of that truth one and immortal which lurks in the force that made it spring into existence it is what it is—and it is indestructible! It knits us in and it knits us out. It has knitted time space, pain, death, corruption, despair and all the illusions—and nothing matters.

Conrad wrote Cunninghame Graham on 31 January 1898:

Faith is a myth and beliefs shift like mists on the shore; thoughts vanish; words, once pronounced, die; and the memory of yesterday is as shadowy as the hope of to-morrow. ...

In this world—as I have known it—we are made to suffer without the shadow of a reason, of a cause or of guilt. ...

There is no morality, no knowledge and no hope; there is only the consciousness of ourselves which drives us about a world that ... is always but a vain and fleeting appearance. ...

A moment, a twinkling of an eye and nothing remains—but a clod of mud, of cold mud, of dead mud cast into black space, rolling around an extinguished sun. Nothing. Neither thought, nor sound, nor soul. Nothing.

Leo Robson suggests that

What [Conrad] really learned as a sailor was not something empirical—an assembly of "places and events"—but the vindication of a perspective he had developed in childhood, an impartial, unillusioned view of the world as a place of mystery and contingency, horror and splendor, where, as he put it in a letter to the London Times, the only indisputable truth is "our ignorance."

According to Robson,

[Conrad's] treatment of knowledge as contingent and provisional commands a range of comparisons, from Rashomon to [the views of philosopher] Richard Rorty; reference points for Conrad's fragmentary method [of presenting information about characters and events] include Picasso and T. S. Eliot—who took the epigraph of "The Hollow Men" from Heart of Darkness. ... Even Henry James's late period, that other harbinger of the modernist novel, had not yet begun when Conrad invented Marlow, and James's earlier experiments in perspective (The Spoils of Poynton, What Maisie Knew) don't go nearly as far as Lord Jim.

=== Language ===
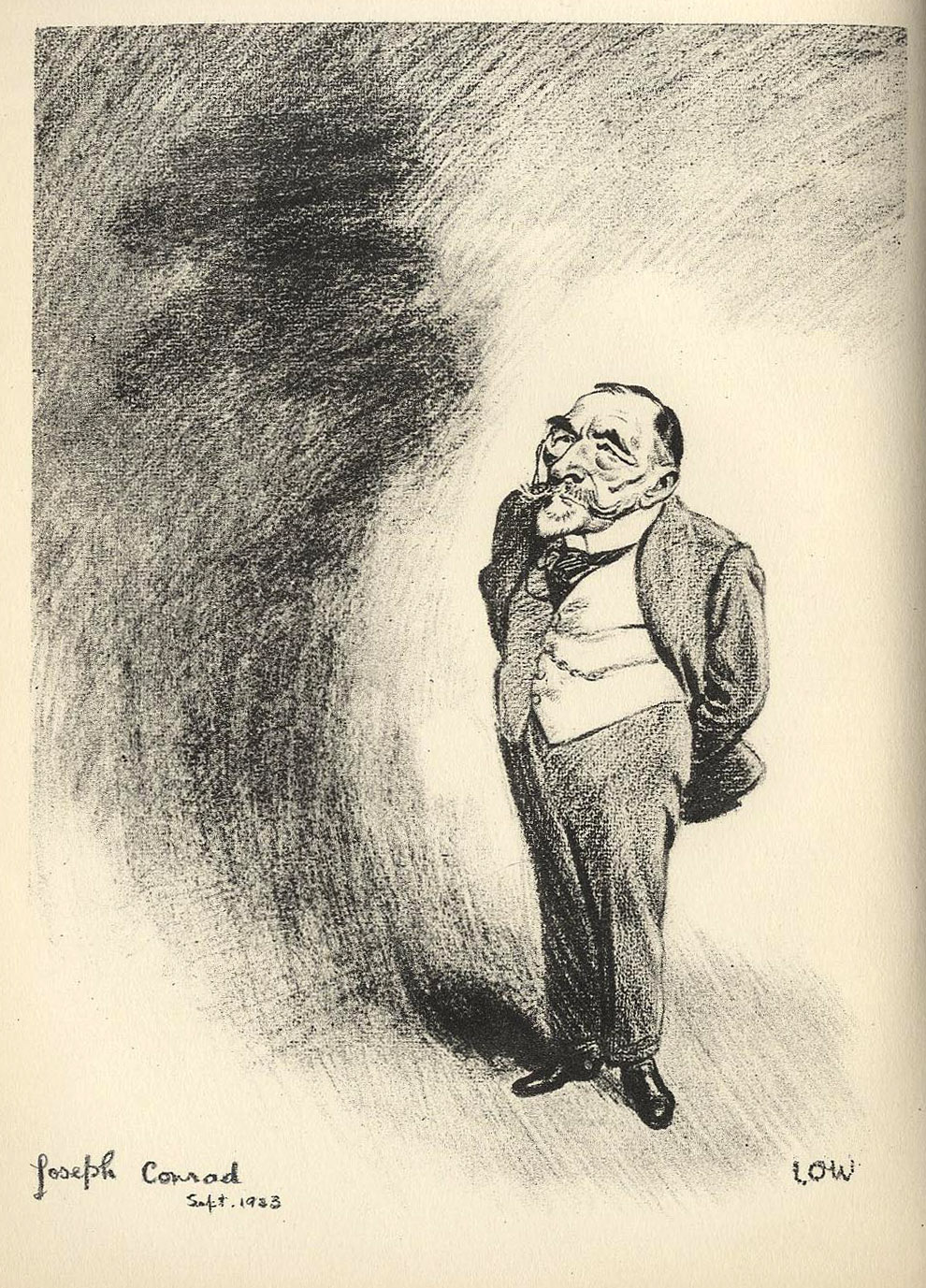
Caricature of Conrad by David Low, 1923

Conrad spoke his native Polish and the French language fluently from childhood and only acquired English in his twenties. He would probably have spoken some Ukrainian as a child; he certainly had to have some knowledge of German and Russian. His son Borys records that, though Conrad had insisted that he spoke only a few words of German, when they reached the Austrian frontier in the family's attempt to leave Poland in 1914, Conrad spoke German "at considerable length and extreme fluency". Russia, Prussia, and Austria had divided up Poland among them, and he was officially a Russian subject until his naturalization as a British subject. As a result, up to this point, his official documents were in Russian. His knowledge of Russian was good enough that his uncle Tadeusz Bobrowski wrote him (22 May 1893) advising that, when Conrad came to visit, he should "telegraph for horses, but in Russian, for Oratów doesn't receive or accept messages in an 'alien' language."

Conrad chose, however, to write his fiction in English. He says in his preface to A Personal Record that writing in English was for him "natural", and that the idea of his having made a deliberate choice between English and French, as some had suggested, was in error. He explained that, though he had been familiar with French from childhood, "I would have been afraid to attempt expression in a language so perfectly 'crystallized'." In 1915, as Jo Davidson sculpted his bust, Conrad answered his question: "Ah… to write French you have to know it. English is so plastic—if you haven't got a word you need you can make it, but to write French you have to be an artist like Anatole France." These statements, as so often in Conrad's "autobiographical" writings, are subtly disingenuous. In 1897 Conrad was visited by a fellow Pole, the philosopher Wincenty Lutosławski, who asked Conrad, "Why don't you write in Polish?" Lutosławski recalled Conrad explaining: "I value our beautiful Polish literature too much to bring into it my clumsy efforts. But for the English my gifts are sufficient and secure my daily bread."

Conrad wrote in A Personal Record that English was "the speech of my secret choice, of my future, of long friendships, of the deepest affections, of hours of toil and hours of ease, and of solitary hours, too, of books read, of thoughts pursued, of remembered emotions—of my very dreams!" In 1878 Conrad's four-year experience in the French merchant marine had been cut short when the French discovered he did not have a permit from the Imperial Russian consul to sail with the French. (Note: At this juncture, Conrad attempted to join the U.S. Navy.) This, and some typically disastrous Conradian investments, had left him destitute and had precipitated a suicide attempt. With the concurrence of his mentor-uncle Tadeusz Bobrowski, who had been summoned to Marseille, Conrad decided to seek employment with the British merchant marine, which did not require Russia's permission. Thus began Conrad's sixteen years' seafarer's acquaintance with the British and with the English language.

Had Conrad remained in the Francophone sphere or had he returned to Poland, the son of the Polish poet, playwright, and translator Apollo Korzeniowski—from childhood exposed to Polish and foreign literature, and ambitious to himself become a writer—he might have ended up writing in French or Polish instead of English. Certainly his Uncle Tadeusz thought Conrad might write in Polish; in an 1881 letter he advised his 23-year-old nephew:

As, thank God, you do not forget your Polish... and your writing is not bad, I repeat what I have... written and said before—you would do well to write... for Wędrowiec [The Wanderer] in Warsaw. We have few travelers, and even fewer genuine correspondents: the words of an eyewitness would be of great interest and in time would bring you... money. It would be an exercise in your native tongue—that thread which binds you to your country and countrymen—and finally a tribute to the memory of your father who always wanted to and did serve his country by his pen.

In the opinion of some biographers, Conrad's third language, English, remained under the influence of his first two languages—Polish and French. This makes his English seem unusual. Najder writes that:

[H]e was a man of three cultures: Polish, French, and English. Brought up in a Polish family and cultural environment... he learned French as a child, and at the age of less than seventeen went to France, to serve... four years in the French merchant marine. At school he must have learned German, but French remained the language he spoke with greatest fluency (and no foreign accent) until the end of his life. He was well versed in French history and literature, and French novelists were his artistic models. But he wrote all his books in English—the tongue he started to learn at the age of twenty. He was thus an English writer who grew up in other linguistic and cultural environments. His work can be seen as located in the borderland of auto-translation.

Inevitably for a trilingual Polish–French–English-speaker, Conrad's writings occasionally show linguistic spillover: "Franglais" or "Poglish"—the inadvertent use of French or Polish vocabulary, grammar, or syntax in his English writings. In one instance, Najder used "several slips in vocabulary, typical for Conrad (Gallicisms) and grammar (usually Polonisms)" as part of internal evidence against Conrad's sometime literary collaborator Ford Madox Ford's claim to have written a certain instalment of Conrad's novel Nostromo, for publication in T. P.'s Weekly, on behalf of an ill Conrad.

The impracticality of working with a language which has long ceased to be one's principal language of daily use is illustrated by Conrad's 1921 attempt at translating into English the Polish physicist, columnist, story-writer, and comedy-writer Bruno Winawer's short play, The Book of Job. Najder writes:

[T]he [play's] language is easy, colloquial, slightly individualized. Particularly Herup and a snobbish Jew, "Bolo" Bendziner, have their characteristic ways of speaking. Conrad, who had had little contact with everyday spoken Polish, simplified the dialogue, left out Herup's scientific expressions, and missed many amusing nuances. The action in the original is quite clearly set in contemporary Warsaw, somewhere between elegant society and the demimonde; this specific cultural setting is lost in the translation. Conrad left out many accents of topical satire in the presentation of the dramatis personae and ignored not only the ungrammatical speech (which might have escaped him) of some characters but even the Jewishness of two of them, Bolo and Mosan.

As a practical matter, by the time Conrad set about writing fiction, he had little choice but to write in English. (Note: Still, Conrad retained a fluency in Polish and French that was more than adequate for ordinary purposes. When at a loss for an English expression, he would use a French one or describe a Polish one, and he often spoke and corresponded with Anglophones and others in French; while speaking and corresponding with Poles in Polish.) Poles who accused Conrad of cultural apostasy because he wrote in English instead of Polish missed the point—as do Anglophones who see, in Conrad's default choice of English as his artistic medium, a testimonial to some sort of innate superiority of the English language. (Note: Conrad's knowledge of French, Latin, German—the root stocks of the English language—and of Polish (since the Middle Ages, much-calqued on Latin) would have been of great assistance to him in acquiring the English language (albeit not its pronunciation). Conrad's knowledge of Polish, with its mostly phonemic alphabet, would have helped him master French and English spelling, much as Mario Pei's knowledge of Italian gave him an "advantage to be able to memorize the written form of an English word in the phonetic pronunciation that such a written form would have had in my native Italian." This ability would, of course, by itself have done nothing to ensure Conrad's command of English pronunciation, which remained always strange to Anglophone ears. It is difficult to master the pronunciation of an unfamiliar language after puberty, and Conrad was 20 before he first stepped onto English soil.)

According to Conrad's close friend and literary assistant Richard Curle, the fact of Conrad writing in English was "obviously misleading" because Conrad "is no more completely English in his art than he is in his nationality". Conrad, according to Curle, "could never have written in any other language save the English language....for he would have been dumb in any other language but the English."

Conrad always retained a strong emotional attachment to his native language. He asked his visiting Polish niece Karola Zagórska, "Will you forgive me that my sons don't speak Polish?" In June 1924, shortly before his death, he apparently expressed a desire that his son John marry a Polish girl and learn Polish, and toyed with the idea of returning for good to now independent Poland.

Conrad bridled at being referred to as a Russian or "Slavonic" writer. The only Russian writer he admired was Ivan Turgenev. "The critics", he wrote to an acquaintance on 31 January 1924, six months before his death, "detected in me a new note and as, just when I began to write, they had discovered the existence of Russian authors, they stuck that label on me under the name of Slavonism. What I venture to say is that it would have been more just to charge me at most with Polonism." However, though Conrad protested that Dostoyevsky was "too Russian for me" and that Russian literature generally was "repugnant to me hereditarily and individually", Under Western Eyes is viewed as Conrad's response to the themes explored in Dostoyevsky's Crime and Punishment.

Conrad had an awareness that, in any language, individual expressions – words, phrases, sentences – are fraught with connotations. He once wrote: "No English word has clean edges." All expressions, he thought, carried so many connotations as to be little more than "instruments for exciting blurred emotions." This might help elucidate the impressionistic quality of many passages in his writings. It also explains why he chose to write his literary works not in Polish or French but in English, with which for decades he had had the greatest contact.

=== Controversy ===
In 1975 the Nigerian writer Chinua Achebe published an essay, "An Image of Africa: Racism in Conrad's 'Heart of Darkness'", which provoked controversy by calling Conrad a "thoroughgoing racist". Achebe's view was that Heart of Darkness cannot be considered a great work of art because it is "a novel which celebrates... dehumanisation, which depersonalises a portion of the human race." Referring to Conrad as a "talented, tormented man", Achebe notes that Conrad (via the protagonist, Charles Marlow) reduces and degrades Africans to "limbs", "ankles", "glistening white eyeballs", etc., while simultaneously (and fearfully) suspecting a common kinship between himself and these natives—leading Marlow to sneer the word "ugly". Achebe also cited Conrad's description of an encounter with an African: "A certain enormous buck nigger encountered in Haiti fixed my conception of blind, furious, unreasoning rage, as manifested in the human animal to the end of my days." Achebe's essay, a landmark in postcolonial discourse, provoked debate, and the questions it raised have been addressed in most subsequent literary criticism of Conrad.

Achebe's critics argue that he fails to distinguish Marlow's view from Conrad's, which results in very clumsy interpretations of the novella. In their view, Conrad portrays Africans sympathetically and their plight tragically, and refers sarcastically to, and condemns outright, the supposedly noble aims of European colonists, thereby demonstrating his skepticism about the moral superiority of white men. Ending a passage that describes the condition of chained, emaciated slaves, the novelist remarks: "After all, I also was a part of the great cause of these high and just proceedings." Some observers assert that Conrad, whose native country had been conquered by imperial powers, empathised by default with other subjugated peoples. Jeffrey Meyers notes that Conrad, like his acquaintance Roger Casement, "was one of the first men to question the Western notion of progress, a dominant idea in Europe from the Renaissance to the Great War, to attack the hypocritical justification of colonialism and to reveal... the savage degradation of the white man in Africa." Likewise, E.D. Morel, who led international opposition to King Leopold II's rule in the Congo, saw Conrad's Heart of Darkness as a condemnation of colonial brutality and referred to the novella as "the most powerful thing written on the subject." More recently, Nidesh Lawtoo complicated the race debate by showing that Conrad's images of "frenzy" depict rituals of "possession trance" that are equally central to Achebe's Things Fall Apart. Lawtoo defines this repetition with a difference which leads Achebe to write a counter-narrative to Heart of Darkness that is almost the opposite but not quite, 'postcolonial mimesis' to differentiate it from Homi Bhabha's postcolonial mimicry.

Conrad scholar Peter Firchow writes that "nowhere in the novel does Conrad or any of his narrators, personified or otherwise, claim superiority on the part of Europeans on the grounds of alleged genetic or biological difference." If Conrad or his novel is racist, it is only in a weak sense, since Heart of Darkness acknowledges racial distinctions "but does not suggest an essential superiority" of any group. Achebe's reading of Heart of Darkness can be (and has been) challenged by a reading of Conrad's other African story, "An Outpost of Progress", which has an omniscient narrator, rather than the embodied narrator, Marlow. Some younger scholars, such as Masood Ashraf Raja, have also suggested that if we read Conrad beyond Heart of Darkness, especially his Malay novels, racism can be further complicated by foregrounding Conrad's positive representation of Muslims.

In 1998 H.S. Zins wrote in Pula: Botswana Journal of African Studies:

Conrad made English literature more mature and reflective because he called attention to the sheer horror of political realities overlooked by English citizens and politicians. The case of Poland, his oppressed homeland, was one such issue. The colonial exploitation of Africans was another. His condemnation of imperialism and colonialism, combined with sympathy for its persecuted and suffering victims, was drawn from his Polish background, his own personal sufferings, and the experience of a persecuted people living under foreign occupation. Personal memories created in him a great sensitivity for human degradation and a sense of moral responsibility."

Adam Hochschild makes a similar point:

What gave [Conrad] such a rare ability to see the arrogance and theft at the heart of imperialism?... Much of it surely had to do with the fact that he himself, as a Pole, knew what it was like to live in conquered territory.... [F]or the first few years of his life, tens of millions of peasants in the Russian empire were the equivalent of slave laborers: serfs. Conrad's poet father, Apollo Korzeniowski, was a Polish nationalist and an opponent of serfdom... [The] boy [Konrad] grew up among exiled prison veterans, talk of serfdom, and the news of relatives killed in uprisings [and he] was ready to distrust imperial conquerors who claimed they had the right to rule other peoples.

Conrad's experience in the Belgian-run Congo made him one of the fiercest critics of the "white man's mission". It was also, writes Najder, Conrad's most daring and last "attempt to become a homo socialis, a cog in the mechanism of society. By accepting the job in the trading company, he joined, for once in his life, an organized, large-scale group activity on land. [...] It is not accidental that the Congo expedition remained an isolated event in Conrad's life. Until his death he remained a recluse in the social sense and never became involved with any institution or clearly defined group of people."

== Citizenship ==
Conrad was a Russian subject, having been born in the Russian part of what had once been the Polish–Lithuanian Commonwealth. After his father's death, Conrad's uncle Bobrowski had attempted to secure Austrian citizenship for him—to no avail, probably because Conrad had not received permission from Russian authorities to remain abroad permanently and had not been released from being a Russian subject. Conrad could not return to the Russian Empire—he would have been liable to many years of military service and, as the son of political exiles, to harassment.

In a letter of 9 August 1877, Conrad's uncle Bobrowski broached two important subjects: (Note: Conrad's own letters written between 1869 and 1894 to his uncle Tadeusz Bobrowski were destroyed in a fire.) the desirability of Conrad's naturalisation abroad (tantamount to release from being a Russian subject) and Conrad's plans to join the British merchant marine. "[D]o you speak English?... I never wished you to become naturalized in France, mainly because of the compulsory military service... I thought, however, of your getting naturalized in Switzerland..." In his next letter, Bobrowski supported Conrad's idea of seeking citizenship of the United States or of "one of the more important Southern [American] Republics".

Eventually Conrad would make his home in England. On 2 July 1886 he applied for British nationality, which was granted on 19 August 1886. Yet, despite having become a subject of Queen Victoria, Conrad had not ceased to be a subject of Tsar Alexander III. To achieve his freedom from that subjection, he had to make many visits to the Russian Embassy in London and politely reiterate his request. He would later recall the Embassy's home at Belgrave Square in his novel The Secret Agent. Finally, on 2 April 1889, the Russian Ministry of Home Affairs released "the son of a Polish man of letters, captain of the British merchant marine" from the status of Russian subject.

== Memorials ==
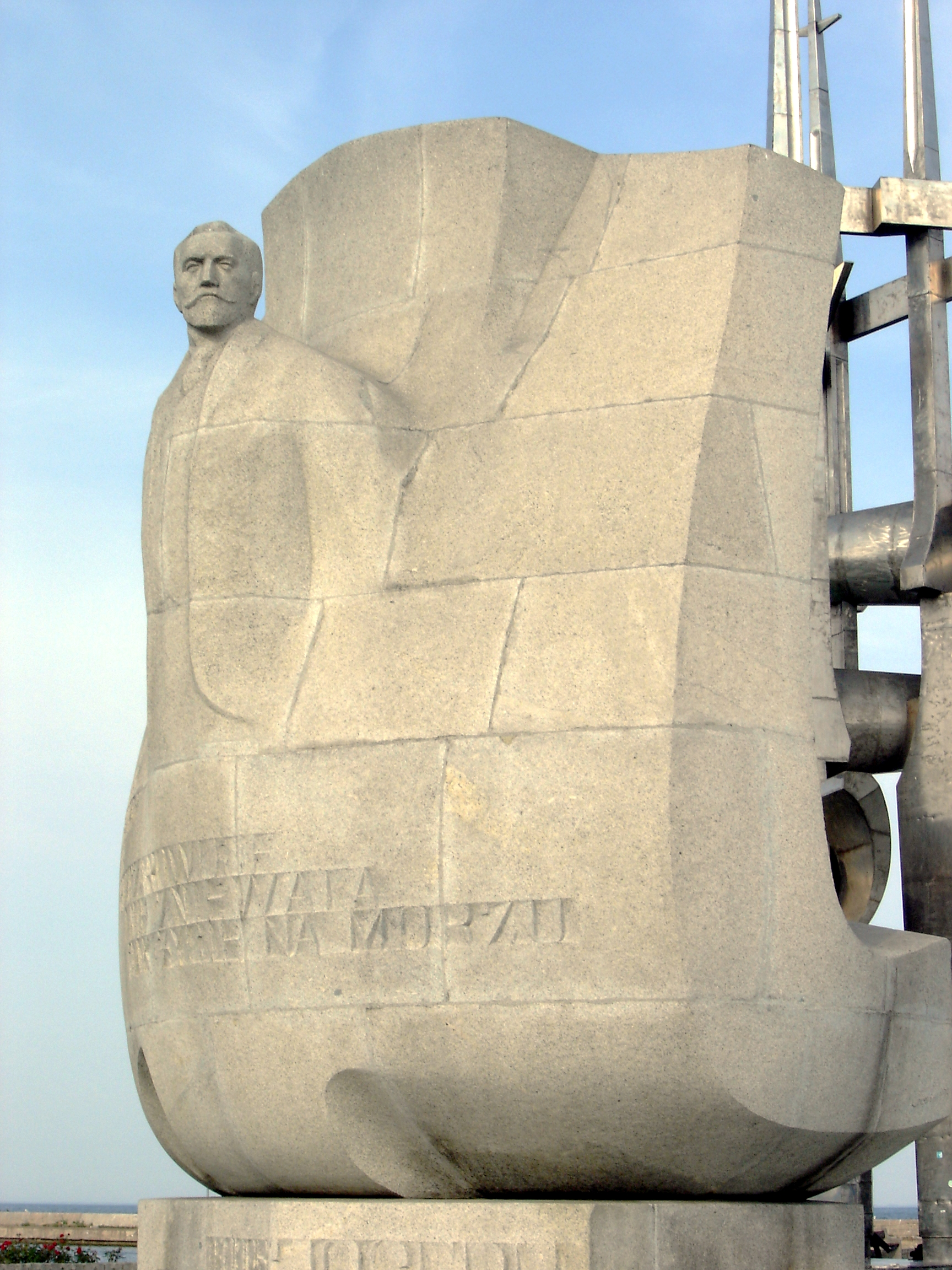
Anchor-shaped Conrad monument at Gdynia, on Poland's Baltic seacoast

An anchor-shaped monument to Conrad at Gdynia, on Poland's Baltic Seacoast, features a quotation from him in Polish: "Nic tak nie nęci, nie rozczarowuje i nie zniewala, jak życie na morzu" ("[T]here is nothing more enticing, disenchanting, and enslaving than the life at sea" – Lord Jim, chapter 2, paragraph 1).

In Circular Quay, Sydney, Australia, a plaque in a "writers walk" commemorates Conrad's visits to Australia between 1879 and 1892. The plaque notes that "Many of his works reflect his 'affection for that young continent.'"

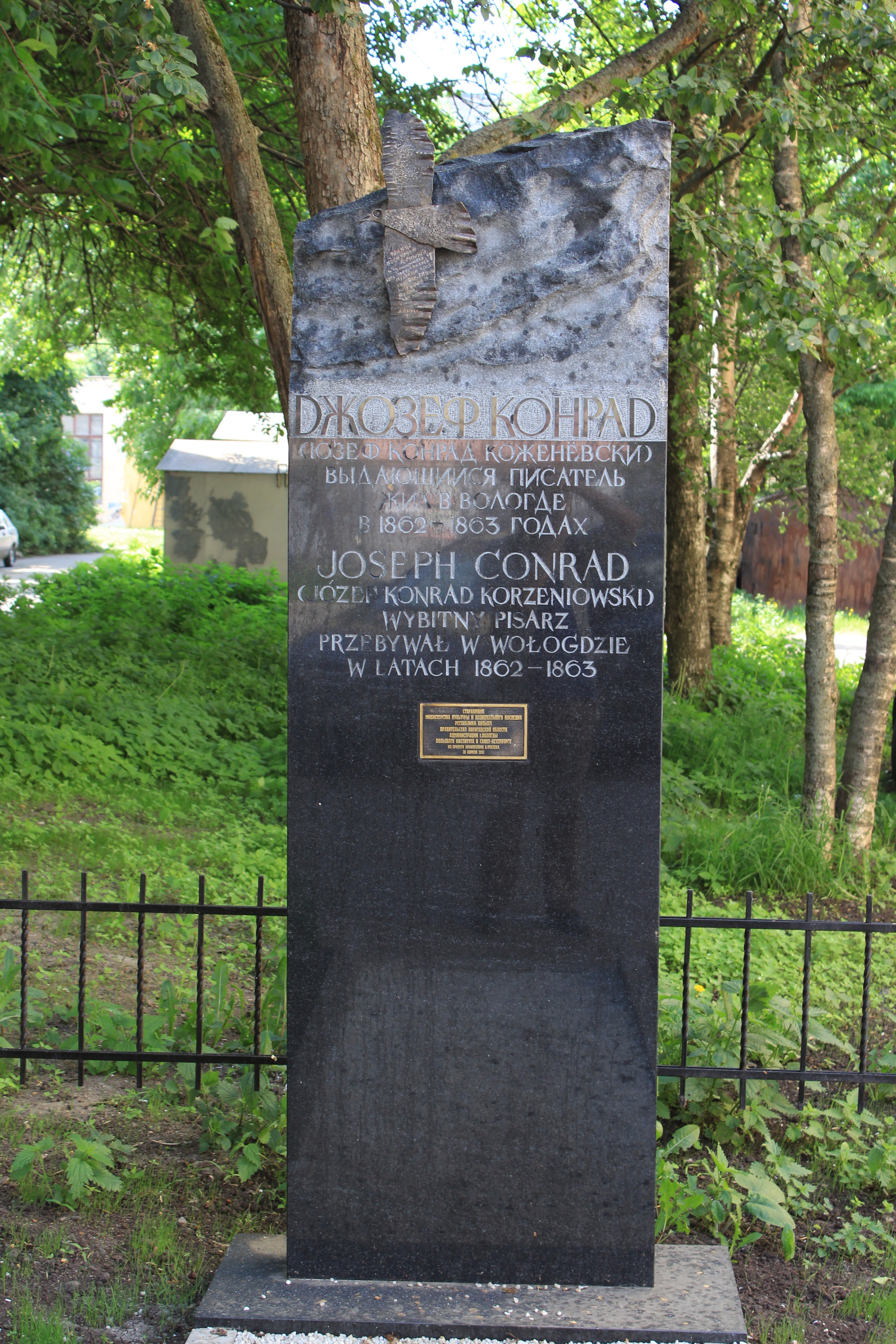
Monument to Conrad in Vologda, Russia, to which Conrad and his parents were exiled in 1862

In San Francisco in 1979, a small triangular square at Columbus Avenue and Beach Street, near Fisherman's Wharf, was dedicated as "Joseph Conrad Square" after Conrad. The square's dedication was timed to coincide with the release of Francis Ford Coppola's Heart of Darkness-inspired film, Apocalypse Now. Conrad does not appear to have ever visited San Francisco.

In the latter part of World War II, the Royal Navy cruiser HMS Danae was rechristened ORP Conrad and served as part of the Polish Navy.

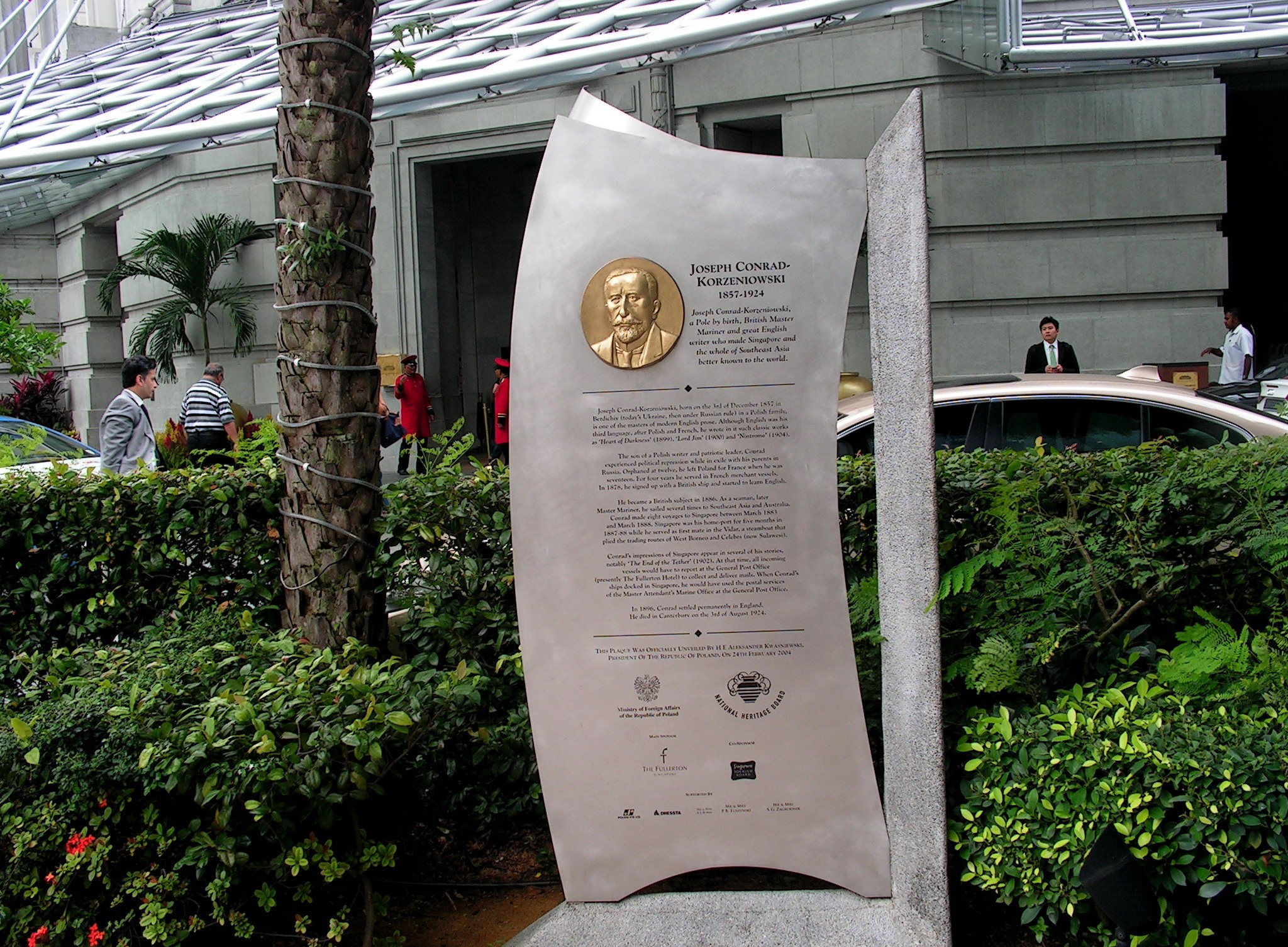
Plaque commemorating "Joseph Conrad–Korzeniowski", Singapore

Notwithstanding the undoubted sufferings that Conrad endured on many of his voyages, sentimentality and canny marketing place him at the best lodgings in several of his destinations. Hotels across the Far East still lay claim to him as an honoured guest, with, however, no evidence to back their claims: Singapore's Raffles Hotel continues to claim he stayed there though he lodged, in fact, at the Sailors' Home nearby. His visit to Bangkok also remains in that city's collective memory, and is recorded in the official history of The Oriental Hotel (where he never, in fact, stayed, lodging aboard his ship, the Otago) along with that of a less well-behaved guest, Somerset Maugham, who pilloried the hotel in a short story in revenge for attempts to eject him.

A plaque commemorating "Joseph Conrad–Korzeniowski" has been installed near Singapore's Fullerton Hotel.

Conrad is also reported to have stayed at Hong Kong's Peninsula Hotel—at a port that, in fact, he never visited. Later literary admirers, notably Graham Greene, followed closely in his footsteps, sometimes requesting the same room and perpetuating myths that have no basis in fact. No Caribbean resort is yet known to have claimed Conrad's patronage, although he is believed to have stayed at a Fort-de-France pension upon arrival in Martinique on his first voyage, in 1875, when he travelled as a passenger on the Mont Blanc.

In April 2013, a monument to Conrad was unveiled in the Russian town of Vologda, where he and his parents lived in exile in 1862–63. The monument was removed, with unclear explanation, in June 2016.

== Legacy ==
Conrad is regarded as one of the greatest writers in the English language. After the publication of Chance in 1913, he was the subject of more discussion and praise than any other English writer of the time. He had a genius for companionship, and his circle of friends, which he had begun assembling even prior to his first publications, included authors and other leading lights in the arts, such as Henry James, Robert Bontine Cunninghame Graham, John Galsworthy, Galsworthy's wife Ada Galsworthy (translator of French literature), Edward Garnett, Garnett's wife Constance Garnett (translator of Russian literature), Stephen Crane, Hugh Walpole, George Bernard Shaw, H. G. Wells (whom Conrad dubbed "the historian of the ages to come"), Arnold Bennett, Norman Douglas, Jacob Epstein, T. E. Lawrence, André Gide, Paul Valéry, Maurice Ravel, Valery Larbaud, Saint-John Perse, Edith Wharton, James Huneker, anthropologist Bronisław Malinowski, Józef Retinger (later a founder of the European Movement, which led to the European Union, and author of Conrad and His Contemporaries). In the early 1900s Conrad composed a short series of novels in collaboration with Ford Madox Ford.

In 1919 and 1922 Conrad's growing renown and prestige among writers and critics in continental Europe fostered his hopes for a Nobel Prize in Literature. It was apparently the French and Swedes—not the English—who favoured Conrad's candidacy. (Note: Jeffrey Meyers remarks: "[T]he [Nobel] Prize [in literature] usually went to safe mediocrities and Conrad, like most of his great contemporaries... did not win it.")

Conrad's Polish Nałęcz coat-of-arms

In April 1924 Conrad, who possessed a hereditary Polish status of nobility and coat-of-arms (Nałęcz), declined a (non-hereditary) British knighthood offered by Labour Party Prime Minister Ramsay MacDonald. (Note: Five of Conrad's close friends had accepted knighthoods, and six others would later do so. On the other hand, Rudyard Kipling and John Galsworthy had already declined knighthood.) (Note: Conrad subtly acknowledged his Polish heritage by using his Nałęcz coat-of-arms as a cover device on an edition of his collected works.) Conrad kept a distance from official structures—he never voted in British national elections—and seems to have been averse to public honours generally; he had already refused honorary degrees from Cambridge, Durham, Edinburgh, Liverpool, and Yale universities.

In the Polish People's Republic, translations of Conrad's works were openly published, except for Under Western Eyes, which in the 1980s was published as an underground "bibuła".

Conrad's narrative style and anti-heroic characters have influenced many authors, including T. S. Eliot, Maria Dąbrowska, F. Scott Fitzgerald, William Faulkner, Gerald Basil Edwards, Ernest Hemingway, Antoine de Saint-Exupéry, André Malraux, George Orwell, Graham Greene, William Golding, William Burroughs, Saul Bellow, Gabriel García Márquez, Peter Matthiessen, (Note: Peter Matthiessen consistently spoke of Conrad as a substantial influence on his work. [10 Paris Review with Peter Matthiessen].) John le Carré, V. S. Naipaul, Philip Roth, Joan Didion, Thomas Pynchon J. M. Coetzee, and Salman Rushdie. (Note: The title of Rushdie's Joseph Anton: A Memoir conflates the given names of Joseph Conrad and Anton Chekhov, two of Rushdie's favourite authors.) Many films have been adapted from, or inspired by, Conrad's works.

== Impressions ==
A portrait of Conrad, aged about 46, was drawn by the historian and poet Henry Newbolt, who met him about 1903:

One thing struck me at once—the extraordinary difference between his expression in profile and when looked at full face. [W]hile the profile was aquiline and commanding, in the front view the broad brow, wide-apart eyes and full lips produced the effect of an intellectual calm and even at times of a dreaming philosophy. Then [a]s we sat in our little half-circle round the fire, and talked on anything and everything, I saw a third Conrad emerge—an artistic self, sensitive and restless to the last degree. The more he talked the more quickly he consumed his cigarettes... And presently, when I asked him why he was leaving London after... only two days, he replied that... the crowd in the streets... terrified him. "Terrified? By that dull stream of obliterated faces?" He leaned forward with both hands raised and clenched. "Yes, terrified: I see their personalities all leaping out at me like tigers!" He acted the tiger well enough almost to terrify his hearers: but the moment after he was talking again wisely and soberly as if he were an average Englishman with not an irritable nerve in his body.

On 12 October 1912, American music critic James Huneker visited Conrad and later recalled being received by "a man of the world, neither sailor nor novelist, just a simple-mannered gentleman, whose welcome was sincere, whose glance was veiled, at times far-away, whose ways were French, Polish, anything but 'literary,' bluff or English."

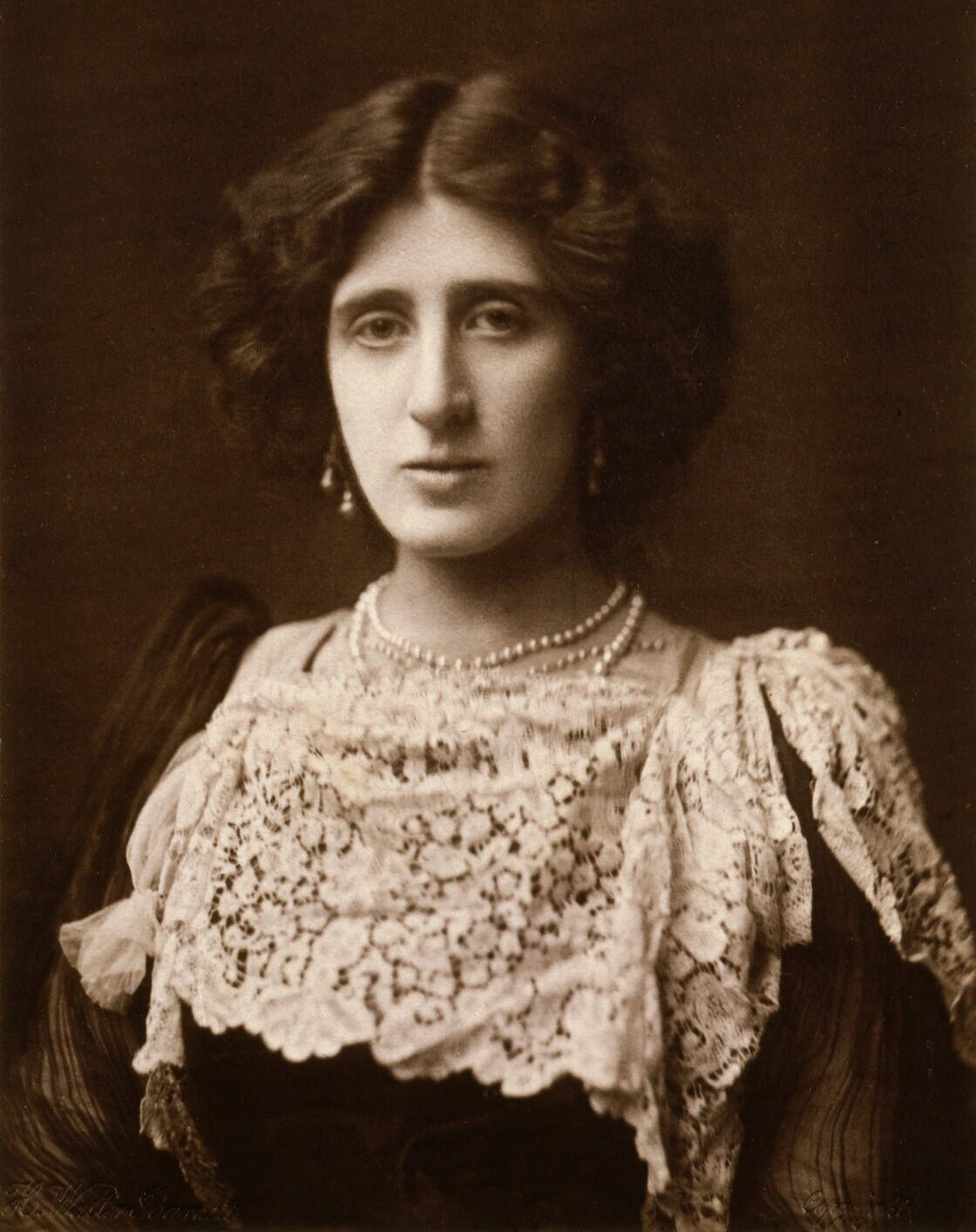
Lady Ottoline Morrell

After respective separate visits to Conrad in August and September 1913, two British aristocrats, the socialite Lady Ottoline Morrell and the mathematician and philosopher Bertrand Russell—who were lovers at the time—recorded their impressions of the novelist. In her diary, Morrell wrote:

I found Conrad himself standing at the door of the house ready to receive me.... [His] appearance was really that of a Polish nobleman. His manner was perfect, almost too elaborate; so nervous and sympathetic that every fibre of him seemed electric... He talked English with a strong accent, as if he tasted his words in his mouth before pronouncing them; but he talked extremely well, though he had always the talk and manner of a foreigner.... He was dressed very carefully in a blue double-breasted jacket. He talked... apparently with great freedom about his life—more ease and freedom indeed than an Englishman would have allowed himself. He spoke of the horrors of the Congo, from the moral and physical shock of which he said he had never recovered... [His wife Jessie] seemed a nice and good-looking fat creature, an excellent cook, ... a good and reposeful mattress for this hypersensitive, nerve-wracked man, who did not ask from his wife high intelligence, only an assuagement of life's vibrations.... He made me feel so natural and very much myself, that I was almost afraid of losing the thrill and wonder of being there, although I was vibrating with intense excitement inside .... His eyes under their pent-house lids revealed the suffering and the intensity of his experiences; when he spoke of his work, there came over them a sort of misty, sensuous, dreamy look, but they seemed to hold deep down the ghosts of old adventures and experiences—once or twice there was something in them one almost suspected of being wicked.... But then I believe whatever strange wickedness would tempt this super-subtle Pole, he would be held in restraint by an equally delicate sense of honour.... In his talk he led me along many paths of his life, but I felt that he did not wish to explore the jungle of emotions that lay dense on either side, and that his apparent frankness had a great reserve.

A month later, Bertrand Russell visited Conrad at Capel House in Orlestone, and the same day on the train wrote down his impressions:

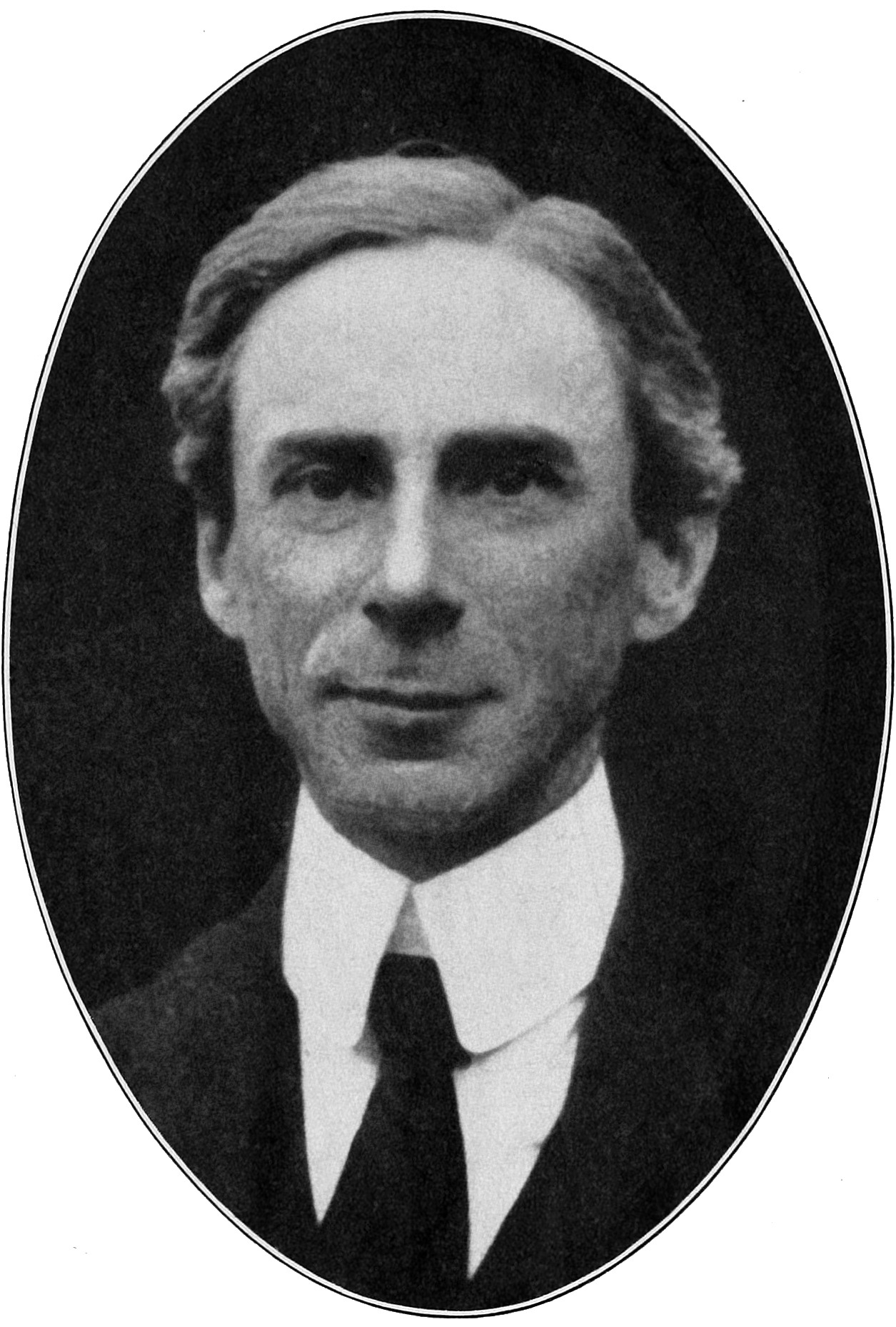
Bertrand Russell

It was wonderful—I loved him & I think he liked me. He talked a great deal about his work & life & aims, & about other writers.... Then we went for a little walk, & somehow grew very intimate. I plucked up courage to tell him what I find in his work—the boring down into things to get to the very bottom below the apparent facts. He seemed to feel I had understood him; then I stopped & we just looked into each other's eyes for some time, & then he said he had grown to wish he could live on the surface and write differently, that he had grown frightened. His eyes at the moment expressed the inward pain & terror that one feels him always fighting.... Then he talked a lot about Poland, & showed me an album of family photographs of the [18]60's—spoke about how dream-like all that seems, & how he sometimes feels he ought not to have had any children, because they have no roots or traditions or relations.

Russell's Autobiography, published over half a century later in 1968, confirms his original experience:

My first impression was one of surprise. He spoke English with a very strong foreign accent, and nothing in his demeanour in any way suggested the sea. He was an aristocratic Polish gentleman to his fingertips.... At our very first meeting, we talked with continually increasing intimacy. We seemed to sink through layer after layer of what was superficial, till gradually both reached the central fire. It was an experience unlike any other... I have known. We looked into each other's eyes, half appalled and half intoxicated to find ourselves together in such a region. The emotion was as intense as passionate love, and at the same time all-embracing. I came away bewildered, and hardly able to find my way among ordinary affairs.

It was not only Anglophones who remarked Conrad's strong foreign accent when speaking English. After French poet Paul Valéry and French composer Maurice Ravel made Conrad's acquaintance in December 1922, Valéry wrote in 1924 of having been astonished at Conrad's "horrible" accent in English.

The subsequent friendship and correspondence between Conrad and Russell lasted, with long intervals, to the end of Conrad's life. Notably, Russell made Conrad the godfather to his first child, John Conrad, and named his second child Conrad Sebastian Robert. In one letter, Conrad avowed his "deep admiring affection, which, if you were never to see me again and forget my existence tomorrow will be unalterably yours usque ad finem." Conrad in his correspondence often used the Latin expression meaning "to the very end", which he seems to have adopted from his faithful guardian, mentor and benefactor, his maternal uncle Tadeusz Bobrowski. (Note: Najder quotes a letter from Bobrowski, of 9 November 1891, containing the Latin expression.)

Conrad was less optimistic than Russell about the possibilities of scientific and philosophical knowledge. In a 1913 letter to acquaintances who had invited Conrad to join their society, he reiterated his belief that it was impossible to understand the essence of either reality or life: both science and art penetrate no further than the outer shapes.

Najder describes Conrad as "[a]n alienated émigré... haunted by a sense of the unreality of other people – a feeling natural to someone living outside the established structures of family, social milieu, and country".

Throughout almost his entire life Conrad was an outsider and felt himself to be one. An outsider in exile; an outsider during his visits to his family in... Poland; an outsider—because of his experiences and bereavement—in [Kraków] and Lwów; an outsider in Marseilles; an outsider, nationally and culturally, on British ships; an outsider as an English writer.

Conrad's sense of loneliness throughout his life in exile found memorable expression in the 1901 short story "Amy Foster".

== Works ==
=== Novels ===
- Almayer's Folly (1895)
- An Outcast of the Islands (1896)
- The Nigger of the "Narcissus" (1897)
- Heart of Darkness (1899)
- Lord Jim (1900)
- The Inheritors (with Ford Madox Ford) (1901)
- The End of the Tether (1902)
- Romance (with Ford Madox Ford, 1903)
- Nostromo (1904)
- The Secret Agent (1907)
- Under Western Eyes (1911)
- Chance (1913)
- Victory (1915)
- The Shadow-Line (1917)
- The Arrow of Gold (1919)
- The Rescue (1920)
- The Rover (1923)
- Suspense (1925; unfinished, published posthumously)

=== Stories ===
- "The Black Mate": written, according to Conrad, in 1886; may be counted as his "opus double zero"?; published 1908; posthumously collected in Tales of Hearsay, 1925.
- "The Idiots": Conrad's truly first short story, which may be counted as his opus zero, was written during his honeymoon (1896), published in The Savoy periodical, 1896, and collected in Tales of Unrest, 1898.
- "The Lagoon": composed 1896; published in Cornhill Magazine, 1897; collected in Tales of Unrest, 1898: "It is the first short story I ever wrote."
- "An Outpost of Progress": written 1896; published in Cosmopolis, 1897, and collected in Tales of Unrest, 1898: "My next [second] effort in short-story writing"; it shows numerous thematic affinities with Heart of Darkness; in 1906, Conrad described it as his "best story".
- "The Return": novella completed early 1897, while writing "Karain"; never published in magazine form; collected in Tales of Unrest, 1898: "[A]ny kind word about 'The Return' (and there have been such words said at different times) awakens in me the liveliest gratitude, for I know how much the writing of that fantasy has cost me in sheer toil, in temper, and in disillusion." Conrad, who suffered while writing this psychological chef-d'oeuvre of introspection, once remarked: "I hate it."
- "Karain: A Memory": written February–April 1897; published November 1897 in Blackwood's Magazine and collected in Tales of Unrest, 1898: "my third short story in... order of time".
- "Youth": written 1898; collected in Youth, a Narrative, and Two Other Stories, 1902
- "Falk": novella written early 1901; collected only in Typhoon and Other Stories, 1903
- "Amy Foster": composed 1901; published in the Illustrated London News, December 1901, and collected in Typhoon and Other Stories, 1903
- "Typhoon": novella begun in 1899 and serialised in Pall Mall Magazine in January–March 1902; collected in Typhoon and Other Stories, 1903
- "To-morrow": written early 1902; serialised in The Pall Mall Magazine, 1902, and collected in Typhoon and Other Stories, 1903
- "Gaspar Ruiz": novella written after Nostromo in 1904–5; published in The Strand Magazine, 1906, and collected in A Set of Six, 1908 (UK), 1915 (US). This story was the only piece of Conrad's fiction ever adapted by the author for cinema, as Gaspar the Strong Man, 1920.
- "An Anarchist": written late 1905; serialised in Harper's Magazine, 1906; collected in A Set of Six, 1908 (UK), 1915 (US)
- "The Informer": written before January 1906; published, December 1906, in Harper's Magazine, and collected in A Set of Six, 1908 (UK), 1915 (US)
- "The Brute": written early 1906; published in The Daily Chronicle, December 1906; collected in A Set of Six, 1908 (UK), 1915 (US)
- "The Duel: A Military Story": novella serialised in the UK in The Pall Mall Magazine, early 1908, and later that year in the US as "The Point of Honor", in the periodical Forum; collected in A Set of Six in 1908 and published by Garden City Publishing in 1924. Joseph Fouché makes a cameo appearance.
- "Il Conde" (i.e., "Conte" [The Count]): appeared in Cassell's Magazine (UK), 1908, and Hampton's (US), 1909; collected in A Set of Six, 1908 (UK), 1915 (US)
- "The Nature of a Crime": collaborative short story, written with Ford Madox Ford; published standalone in 1909
- "The Secret Sharer": written December 1909; published in Harper's Magazine, 1910, and collected in Twixt Land and Sea, 1912
- "Prince Roman": written 1910, published 1911 in The Oxford and Cambridge Review; posthumously collected in Tales of Hearsay, 1925; based on the story of Prince Roman Sanguszko of Poland (1800–81)
- "A Smile of Fortune": a novella, written in mid-1910; published in London Magazine, February 1911; collected in 'Twixt Land and Sea, 1912
- "Freya of the Seven Isles": a novella, written late 1910–early 1911; published in The Metropolitan Magazine and London Magazine, early 1912 and July 1912, respectively; collected in 'Twixt Land and Sea, 1912
- "The Partner": written 1911; published in Within the Tides, 1915
- "The Inn of the Two Witches": written 1913; published in Within the Tides, 1915
- "Because of the Dollars": written 1914; published in Within the Tides, 1915
- "The Planter of Malata": novella written 1914; published in Within the Tides, 1915
- "The Warrior's Soul": written late 1915–early 1916; published in Land and Water, March 1917; collected in Tales of Hearsay, 1925
- "The Tale": Conrad's only story about World War I; written 1916, first published 1917 in The Strand Magazine; posthumously collected in Tales of Hearsay, 1925

=== Essays ===
- "Autocracy and War" (1905)
- The Mirror of the Sea (collection of autobiographical essays first published in various magazines 1904–06), 1906
- A Personal Record (also published as Some Reminiscences), 1912
- The First News, 1918
- The Lesson of the Collision: A monograph upon the loss of the "Empress of Ireland", 1919
- The Polish Question, 1919
- The Shock of War, 1919
- Notes on Life and Letters, 1921
- Notes on My Books, 1921
- Last Essays, edited by Richard Curle, 1926
- The Congo Diary and Other Uncollected Pieces, edited by Zdzisław Najder, 1978, ISBN 978-0-385-00771-9

== Adaptations ==
A number of works in various genres and media have been based on, or inspired by, Conrad's writings, including:

=== Cinema ===
- Victory (1919), directed by Maurice Tourneur
- Gaspar the Strong Man (1920), adapted by Conrad from "Gaspar Ruiz"
- Lord Jim (1925), directed by Victor Fleming
- Niebezpieczny raj (Dangerous Paradise, 1930), a Polish adaptation of Victory
- Dangerous Paradise (1930), an adaptation of Victory directed by William Wellman
- Sabotage (1936), adapted from Conrad's The Secret Agent, directed by Alfred Hitchcock
- Under Western Eyes (1936), directed by Marc Allégret
- Victory (1940), featuring Fredric March
- An Outcast of the Islands (1952), directed by Carol Reed and featuring Trevor Howard
- Laughing Anne (1953), based on Conrad's short story "Because of the Dollars" and his play Laughing Anne.
- Lord Jim (1965), directed by Richard Brooks and starring Peter O'Toole
- The Rover (1967), adaptation of the novel The Rover (1923), directed by Terence Young, featuring Anthony Quinn
- La ligne d'ombre (1973), a TV adaptation of The Shadow-Line by Georges Franju
- Smuga cienia (The Shadow Line, 1976), a Polish-British adaptation of The Shadow-Line, directed by Andrzej Wajda
- The Duellists (1977), an adaptation by Ridley Scott of "The Duel"
- Naufragio (1977), a Mexican adaptation of "To-morrow" directed by Jaime Humberto Hermosillo
- Apocalypse Now (1979), by Francis Ford Coppola, adapted from Heart of Darkness
- Un reietto delle isole (1980), by Giorgio Moser, an Italian adaptation of An Outcast of the Islands, starring Maria Carta
- Victory (1995), adapted by director Mark Peploe from the novel
- The Secret Agent (1996), starring Bob Hoskins, Patricia Arquette and Gérard Depardieu
- Swept from the Sea (1997), an adaptation of "Amy Foster" directed by Beeban Kidron
- Gabrielle (2005) directed by Patrice Chéreau. Adaptation of the short story "The Return", starring Isabelle Huppert and Pascal Greggory.
- Hanyut (2011), a Malaysian adaptation of Almayer's Folly
- Almayer's Folly (2011), directed by Chantal Akerman
- Secret Sharer (2014), inspired by "The Secret Sharer", directed by Peter Fudakowski
- The Young One (2016), an adaptation of the short story "Youth", directed by Julien Samani
- An Outpost of Progress (2016), an adaptation of the short story "An Outpost of Progress", directed by Hugo Vieira da Silva

=== Television ===
- Heart of Darkness (1958), a CBS 90-minute loose adaption on the anthology show Playhouse 90, starring Roddy McDowall, Boris Karloff, and Eartha Kitt
- The Secret Agent (1992 TV series) and The Secret Agent (2016 TV series), BBC TV series adapted from the novel The Secret Agent
- Heart of Darkness (1993) a TNT feature-length adaptation, directed by Nicolas Roeg, starring John Malkovich and Tim Roth; also released on VHS and DVD
- Nostromo (1997), a BBC TV adaptation, co-produced with Italian and Spanish TV networks and WGBH Boston

=== Operas ===
- Heart of Darkness (2011), a chamber opera in one act by Tarik O'Regan, with an English-language libretto by artist Tom Phillips.

=== Orchestral works ===
- Suite from Heart of Darkness (2013) for orchestra and narrator by Tarik O'Regan, extrapolated from the 2011 opera of the same name.

=== Video games ===
- Spec Ops: The Line (2012) by Yager Development, inspired by Heart of Darkness.

== See also ==
- Alice Sarah Kinkead
- ORP Conrad – a World War II Polish Navy cruiser named after Joseph Conrad
- Joseph Conrad Square
- Joseph Conrad's career at sea
- King Leopold's Ghost
- List of covers of Time magazine (1920s) – 7 April 1923
- List of Poles (prose literature)
- Politics in fiction
- Stefan Bobrowski, one of Conrad's maternal uncles. Like Conrad's father, he was a "Red"-faction political leader.

== Sources ==
- Conrad, Joseph (1919). A Personal Record. London: J.M. Dent & Sons.
- Conrad, Borys (1970). My Father: Joseph Conrad. Calder & Boyars. ISBN 9781847491268.
- Curle, Richard (1914). Joseph Conrad. A Study. Doubleday, Page & Company.
- Firchow, Peter Edgerly, Envisioning Africa: Racism and Imperialism in Conrad's Heart of Darkness, University Press of Kentucky, 2000.
- Gorra, Michael, "Corrections of Taste" (review of Terry Eagleton, Critical Revolutionaries: Five Critics Who Changed the Way We Read, Yale University Press, 323 pp.), The New York Review of Books, vol. LXIX, no. 15 (6 October 2022), pp. 16–18.
- Gurko, Leo (1962). Joseph Conrad: Giant in Exile. MacMillan.
- Hochschild, Adam (March–April 2018). "Stranger in Strange Lands: Joseph Conrad lived in a far wider world than even the greatest of his contemporaries". Foreign Affairs. Vol. 97, no. 2.
- Karl, Frederick Robert (1979). Joseph Conrad: The Three Lives. Farrar, Straus, and Giroux.
- Lawtoo, Nidesh (2016). Conrad's Shadow: Catastrophe, Mimesis, Theory. Michigan State University Press. ISBN 9781611862188.
- Meyers, Jeffrey (1991). Joseph Conrad: A Biography. Charles Scribner's Sons. ISBN 9780684192307.
- Najder, Zdzisław (1969). "Korzeniowski, Józef Teodor Konrad". Polski Słownik Biograficzny. Vol. XIV. Wrocław: Zakład Narodowy Imienia Ossolińskich. pp. 173–176.
- Najder, Zdzisław (1984). Conrad under Familial Eyes. Cambridge University Press. ISBN 0-521-25082-X.
- Najder, Zdzisław (2007). Joseph Conrad: A Life. Camden House. ISBN 978-1-57113-347-2.
- Pei, Mario, The Story of Language, with an Introduction by Stuart Berg Flexner, revised ed., New York, New American Library, 1984, ISBN 0-452-25527-9.
- Robson, Leo (20 November 2017). "The Mariner's Prayer: Was Joseph Conrad right to think that everyone was getting him wrong? Conrad mined his life for material, but chafed at being called a 'writer of the sea'". The New Yorker. pp. 91–97.
- Said, Edward W. (2008). Joseph Conrad and the Fiction of Autobiography. New York: Columbia University Press. ISBN 978-0-231-14005-8.
- Stape, J. H. (2014). The New Cambridge Companion to Joseph Conrad. Cambridge University Press.
- Stape, John (2007). The Several Lives of Joseph Conrad. William Heinemann.
- Stewart, J. I. M. (1968). Joseph Conrad (1st ed.). London: Longmans. ISBN 9780582112025.
- Taborski, Roman (1969), "Korzeniowski, Apollo", Polski słownik biograficzny, vol. XIV, Wrocław, Polska Akademia Nauk, pp. 167–69.
- Tóibín, Colm (22 February 2018). "The Heart of Conrad (review of Maya Jasanoff, The Dawn Watch: Joseph Conrad in a Global World, Penguin, 375 pp.)". The New York Review of Books. Vol. LXV, no. 3.
- Zins, H. S. (1998). "Joseph Conrad and British Critics of Colonialism". Pula. 12 (1 & 2).
