= John Malkovich on stage and screen =

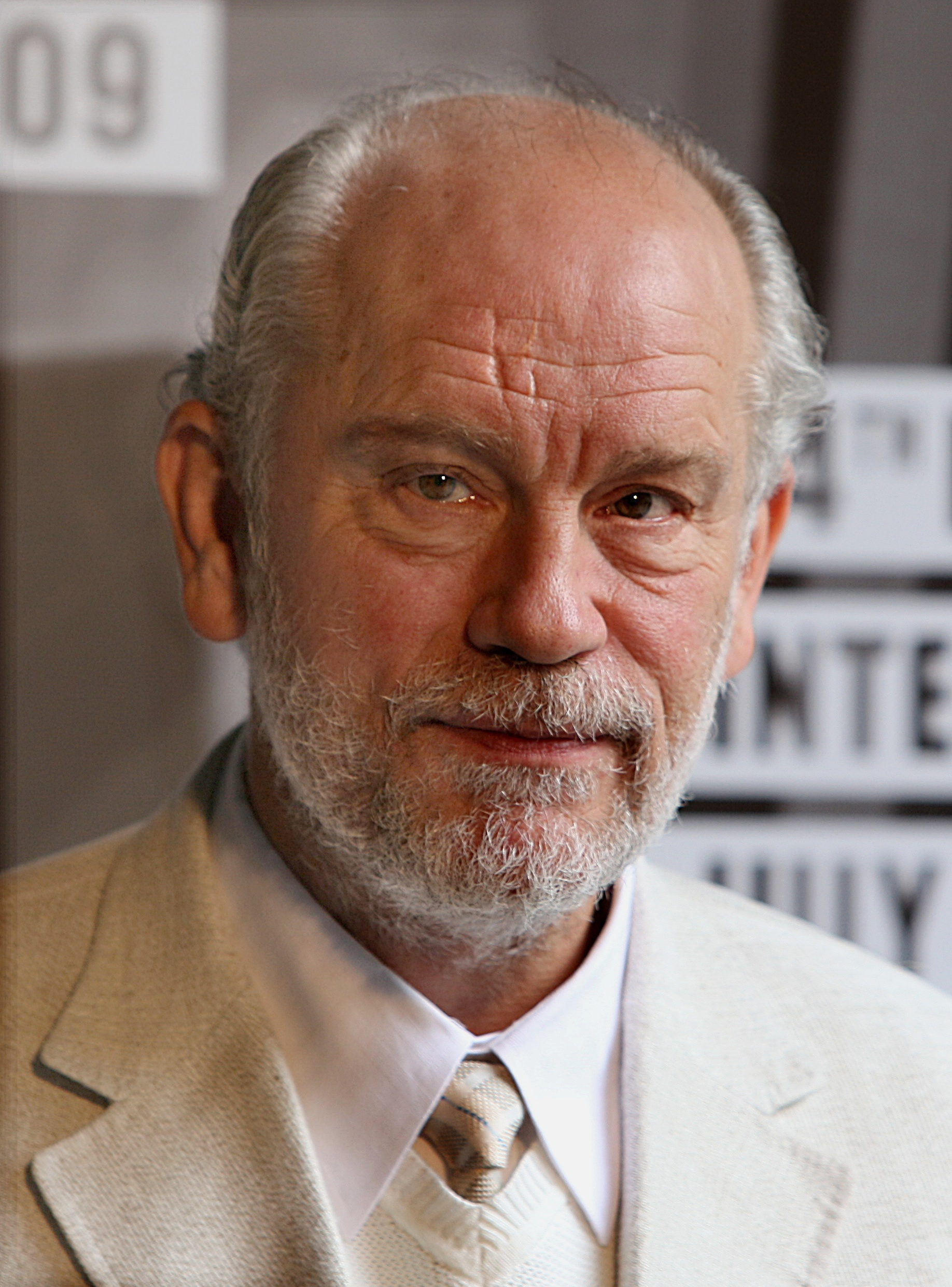
Malkovich at the 2009 Karlovy Vary International Film Festival

American actor, director, and producer John Malkovich has appeared in more than 70 motion pictures. He started acting in the 1980s, appearing in the films Places in the Heart (1984) with Sally Field, Death of a Salesman (1985), The Glass Menagerie (1987), Empire of the Sun (1987), and Dangerous Liaisons (1988) with Glenn Close. His role in Places in the Heart earned him an Academy Award nomination. During the 1990s, he starred in the films The Sheltering Sky (1990), Of Mice and Men (1992) as Lennie Small, In the Line of Fire (1993) as Mitch Leary, Beyond the Clouds (1995) as The Director, The Portrait of a Lady (1996) as Gilbert Osmond, Con Air (1997) as Cyrus "The Virus" Grissom, The Man in the Iron Mask (1998) as Athos, Being John Malkovich (1999) as John Horatio Malkovich, and The Messenger: The Story of Joan of Arc (1999) as Charles VII. His role as Mitch Leary in In the Line of Fire earned him his second Academy Award nomination.

Malkovich went on to appear in the early 2000s films Johnny English (2003) as Pascal Sauvage, The Libertine (2004) as Charles II, The Hitchhiker's Guide to the Galaxy (2005) as Humma Kavula, Eragon (2006) as Galbatorix, Klimt (2006) as Gustav Klimt, Burn After Reading (2008) as Osborne Cox, and Changeling (2008) as Reverend Briegleb. In 2010, he co-starred with Josh Brolin and Megan Fox in the science fiction Western Jonah Hex as Quentin Turnbull. The same year, he also starred in Secretariat with Diane Lane, and Red with Bruce Willis, Morgan Freeman and Helen Mirren, a role he later reprised in the sequel Red 2 (2013). Malkovich made an appearance in the science fiction action film Transformers: Dark of the Moon (2011) as Bruce Brazos. He co-starred in the romantic zombie comedy film Warm Bodies (2013) as General Grigio and lent his voice to the animated movie Penguins of Madagascar (2014) as the villainous octopus Dave.

As a producer, Malkovich has produced the films Ghost World (2001), The Libertine (2004), Juno (2007), and The Perks of Being a Wallflower (2012).

== Filmography ==
=== As actor ===
==== Film ====
Year	Title	Role	Notes	Ref.
1978	A Wedding	Extra	Uncredited	
1984	Places in the Heart	Mr. Will		
1984	The Killing Fields	Al Rockoff		
1985	Eleni	Nick Gage		
1987	The Glass Menagerie	Tom Wingfield		
1987	Making Mr. Right	Dr. Jeff Peters / Ulysses		
1987	Empire of the Sun	Basie		
1988	Miles from Home	Barry Maxwell		
1988	Dangerous Liaisons	Vicomte de Valmont		
1990	The Sheltering Sky	Port Moresby		
1991	The Object of Beauty	Jake Bartholemew		
1991	Queens Logic	Eliot		
1992	Shadows and Fog	Paul, The Clown		
1992	Of Mice and Men	Lennie Small		
1992	Jennifer 8	FBI Agent St. Anne		
1993	In the Line of Fire	Mitch Leary		
1993	Alive	Older Carlitos Paez	Uncredited	
1993	The Convent	Michael Padovic		
1995	Beyond the Clouds	The Director		
1996	Mary Reilly	Dr. Henry Jekyll / Mr. Edward Hyde		
1996	The Portrait of a Lady	Gilbert Osmond		
1996	The Ogre	Abel Tiffauges		
1996	Mulholland Falls	General Thomas Timms		
1997	Con Air	Cyrus "The Virus" Grissom		
1998	The Man in the Iron Mask	Athos		
1998	Rounders	Teddy "KGB"		
1999	Being John Malkovich	John Horatio Malkovich		
1999	The Messenger: The Story of Joan of Arc	Charles VII		
1999	Le Temps Retrouvé	Le Baron de Charlus		
2000	Shadow of the Vampire	F. W. Murnau		
2001	Knockaround Guys	Teddy Deserve		
2001	Hotel	Omar Jonnson		
2001	I'm Going Home	John Crawford		
2001	Les âmes fortes	Monsieur Numance		
2002	The Dancer Upstairs	Abimael Guzman	Uncredited; also producer and director	
2002	Hideous Man	The Narrator	Short film; also writer and director	
2002	Ripley's Game	Tom Ripley		
2002	Adaptation	Himself		
2003	Johnny English	Pascal Sauvage		
2003	Um Filme Falado	Captain John Walesa		
2004	The Libertine	Charles II	Also producer	
2005	The Hitchhiker's Guide to the Galaxy	Humma Kavula		
2005	Colour Me Kubrick	Alan Conway		
2005	Flipping Uncle Kimono	Himself	Documentary	
2006	Art School Confidential	Professor Sandiford	Also producer	
2006	Eragon	Galbatorix		
2006	Klimt	Gustav Klimt		
2006	The Call	Priest	Short film	
2007	Drunkboat	Mort		
2007	Beowulf	Unferth		
2007	Polis Is This: Charles Olson and the Persistence of Place	Himself	Documentary	
2008	The Great Buck Howard	Buck Howard		
2008	Gardens of the Night	Michael		
2008	In Transit	Colonel Pavlov		
2008	Burn After Reading	Osborne Cox		
2008	Disgrace	David Lurie		
2008	Mutant Chronicles	Constantine		
2008	Changeling	Reverend Gustav Briegleb		
2009	Afterwards	Joseph Kay		
2010	Jonah Hex	Quentin Turnbull		
2010	Secretariat	Lucien Laurin		
2010	Red	Marvin Boggs		
2011	Transformers: Dark of the Moon	Bruce Brazos		
2012	Lines of Wellington	Arthur Wellesley, 1st Duke of Wellington		
2013	Warm Bodies	General Grigio		
2013	Siberian Education	Grandfather Kuzya		
2013	Ecstasy	Vinny	Short film	
2013	Red 2	Marvin Boggs		
2014	Cesar Chavez	Bogdanovich Senior	Also executive producer	
2014	Penguins of Madagascar	Dave / Dr. Octavius Brine	Voice only	
2014	Casanova Variations	Giacomo Casanova		
2014	Cut Bank	Sheriff Vogel		
2016	Zoolander 2	Chazz Spencer		
2016	Dominion	Dr. Felton		
2016	Deepwater Horizon	Donald Vidrine		
2016	Hell	The Soldier	Short film	
2016	Psychogenic Fugue	Various Roles	Short film	
2017	Unlocked	Bob Hunter		
2017	The Wilde Wedding	Laurence Darling	Also executive producer	
2017	I Love You, Daddy	Leslie Goodwin		
2017	About Love. For Adults Only	Ed, The Lecturer		
2017	Bullet Head	Walker		
2018	Casanovagen	John Malkovich / Giacomo Casanova		
2018	Supercon	Sid Newberry		
2018	Mile 22	CIA Officer James Bishop		
2018	Bird Box	Douglas		
2019	Extremely Wicked, Shockingly Evil and Vile	Judge Edward Cowart		
2019	Velvet Buzzsaw	Piers		
2019	Valley of the Gods	Wes Tauros		
2020	Arkansas	"Bright"		
2020	Ava	Duke		
2021	Rogue Hostage	Sam Safty		
2021	The Survivalist	Aaron Neville Ramsey		
2022	Shattered	Ronald	Also producer	
2022	Chariot	Dr. Karn		
2022	White Elephant	Glen Follett		
2022	Savage Salvation	Peter		
2022	Mindcage	The Artist		
2023	Seneca – On the Creation of Earthquakes	Seneca the Younger		
2023	One Ranger	Geddes		
2023	Fool's Paradise	Ed Cote		
2023	The Line	Beach Miller		
2023	Mr. Blake at Your Service!	Andrew Blake		
2025	Opus	Alfred Moretti		
2025	In the Hand of Dante	Joe Black		
2025	Sacrifice	Joan's father		
2025	The Yellow Tie	Older Sergiu Celibidache		
2026	Croatia – I Hear It's Beautiful	Himself	Short film	
2026	Wild Horse Nine	Chris Carlisle		
TBA	A Winter's Journey †	Leiermann	Post-production	
2115 (Note: Film was completed in 2015, but will not be released until 2115)	100 Years †	Male Protagonist	Post-production	

Key
†	Denotes films that have not yet been released

==== Television ====
Year	Title	Role	Notes	Ref.
1981	Word of Honor	Gary	Television film	
1983	Say Goodnight, Gracie	Steve	Television film	
1984	True West	Lee	Television film	
1985	Death of a Salesman	Biff Loman	Television film	
1986	Rocket to the Moon	Ben Stark	Television film	
1987	Santabear's High Flying Adventure	Santa Claus (voice)	Television film	
1989, 1993, 2008	Saturday Night Live	Himself / Host	3 episodes	
1991	Old Times	Deeley	Television film	
1993	Heart of Darkness	Kurtz	Television film	
1999	RKO 281	Herman J. Mankiewicz	Television film	
2000	Les Misérables	Javert	4 episodes	
2002	Napoléon	Charles Talleyrand	4 episodes	
2014	Crossbones	Blackbeard	9 episodes	
2018	The ABC Murders	Hercule Poirot	3 episodes; also associate producer	
2018–2019, 2023	Billions	Grigor Andolov	7 episodes	
2019	Matchday: Inside FC Barcelona	The Narrator (voice)	8 episodes	
2020	The New Pope	Pope John Paul III	9 episodes	
2020	Home Movie: The Princess Bride	The Impressive Clergyman	Episode: "Chapter Nine: Have Fun Storming The Castle!"	
2020–2022	Space Force	Dr. Adrian Mallory	17 episodes	
2021–2023	Ten Year Old Tom	Mr. B (voice)	20 episodes	
2024	The New Look	Lucien Lelong	7 episodes	
2024	Ripley	Reeves Minot	Episode: "VIII Narcissus"	
2026	Bad Monkey †	Spencer	Main role (season 2)	
TBA	Bishop †	Lincoln Graves	Main role	

Key
†	Denotes television productions that have not yet been released

==== Podcasts ====
Year	Title	Role	Notes	Ref.
2024	Unsinkable	Chief Engineer Pollard (voice)	11 episodes	

==== Video games ====
Year	Title	Role	Notes	Ref.
2015	Call of Duty: Advanced Warfare	Oz	Exo Zombies	

==== Music videos ====
Year	Artist	Title	Ref.
1992	Annie Lennox	"Walking on Broken Glass"	
2015	Eminem	"Phenomenal"	

=== As director ===
- 2002 The Dancer Upstairs
- 2002 Hideous Man

=== As writer ===
- 2002 Hideous Man
- 2015 100 Years (due to be released in 2115)

=== As producer ===
- 1988 The Accidental Tourist (executive producer)
- 2001 Ghost World
- 2002 The Dancer Upstairs
- 2004 The Libertine
- 2006 Kill the Poor
- 2006 Art School Confidential
- 2007 Juno
- 2011 Young Adult (executive producer)
- 2012 The Perks of Being a Wallflower
- 2013 César Chávez (executive producer)
- 2015 Demolition (executive producer)
- 2017 The Wilde Wedding (executive producer)
- 2022 Shattered

== Theatre ==
=== As actor ===
Year	Title	Role	Playwright	Venue
1976	The Dumb Waiter	Gus	Harold Pinter	Highland Park, Chicago
1977	Birdbath	Frankie Basta	Leonard Melfi	Jane Adams Hull House, Chicago
1977	Our Late Night		Wallace Shawn	Jane Adams Hull House, Chicago
1978	Fifth of July	Jed Jenkins	Lanford Wilson	St. Nicholas Theater, Chicago
1979	The Glass Menagerie	Tom Wingfield	Tennessee Williams	Highland Park, Chicago
1979	Say Goodnight, Gracie	Steve	Ralph Pape	Theatre Building, Chicago
1979	Curse of the Starving Class	Wesley Tate	Sam Shepard	Goodman Theatre, Chicago
1980	Balm in Gilead	Stranger	Lanford Wilson	Jane Addams Hull House Center
1980	Of Mice and Men	Lennie Small	John Steinbeck	Jane Addams Hull House Center
1981	Big Mother	Mr. James	Charles DiZenzo	Jane Addams Hull House Center
1981	A Sorrow Beyond Dreams	Narrator	Ralph Manheim	St. Nicholas Theater, Chicago
1982	True West	Lee	Sam Shepard	Steppenwolf Theatre, Chicago
1982	True West	Lee	Sam Shepard	Cherry Lane Theatre, Off-Broadway
1984	Death of a Salesman	Biff Loman	Arthur Miller	Broadhurst Theatre, Broadway debut
1985	Arms and the Man	Captain Bluntschli	George Bernard Shaw	Circle in the Square Theatre, Broadway
1987	Burn This	Pale	Lanford Wilson	Mark Taper Forum, Los Angeles
1987	Burn This	Pale	Lanford Wilson	Theater 890, Off-Broadway
1987	Burn This	Pale	Lanford Wilson	Plymouth Theatre, Broadway
1990	Burn This	Pale	Lanford Wilson	Lyric Theatre, West End
1991	States of Shock	Colonel	Sam Shepard	American Place Theater, Off-Broadway
1992	A Slip of the Tongue	Dominic Tantra	Dusty Hughes	Shaftesbury Theatre, West End
1996	The Libertine	John Wilmot	Stephen Jeffreys	Steppenwolf Theatre, Chicago
2005	Lost Land	Count Kristof	Stephen Jeffreys	Steppenwolf Theatre, Chicago
2008–2011	The Infernal Comedy – Confessions of a Serial Killer	Jack Unterweger	Michael Sturminger	International tour
2010–present	The Music Critic	Narrator	Aleksey Igudesman	International Tour
2011–2013	The Giacomo Variations	Giacomo Casanova	Michael Sturminger	International tour
2017	Just Call Me God	Satur Diman Cha	Michael Sturminger	European tour
2019	Bitter Wheat	Barney Fein	David Mamet	Garrick Theatre, West End
2022–2023	In the Solitude of Cotton Fields	The Client / The Dealer	Bernard-Marie Koltès	European tour
2025	The Hunger Games: On Stage	Coriolanus Snow	Conor McPherson	Troubadour Canary Wharf Theatre, London (Note: His performance was pre-recorded.)

=== As director (partial) ===
- 1977 The Indian Wants the Bronx (in Chicago)
- 1994 Libra (in Chicago, also playwright)
- 2027 Real World (in Japan)
