= List of awards and nominations received by John Malkovich =

John Malkovich awards and nominations
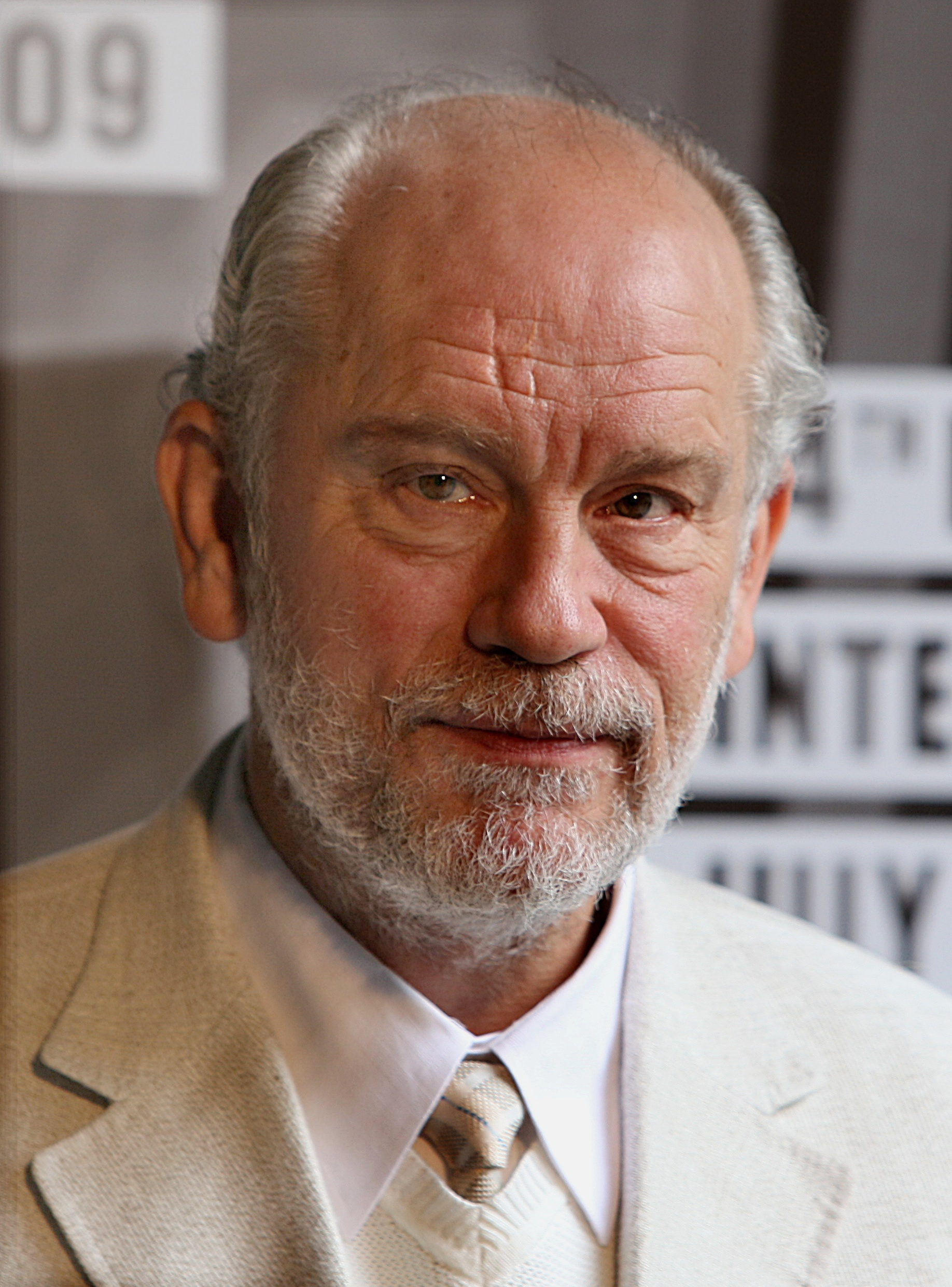
- Malkovich in 2009
Awards and nominations
Award	Wins	Nominations
Academy Awards	0	2
Actor Awards	0	2
BAFTA Awards	0	1
Emmy Awards	3	5
Golden Globe Awards	0	3
Olivier Awards	0	1

Totals (Note: Certain award groups do not simply award one winner. They acknowledge several different recipients, have runners-up, and have third place. Since this is a specific recognition and is different from losing an award, runner-up mentions are considered wins in this award tally. For simplification and to avoid errors, each award in this list has been presumed to have had a prior nomination.)
- Wins: 16
- Nominations: 36

John Malkovich is an American actor. Known for his character actor roles on stage and screen, he has received various accolades including three Emmy Awards and the Venice International Film Festival's Volpi Cup for Best Actor as well as nominations for two Academy Awards, two Actor Awards, a BAFTA Award, three Golden Globe Awards and a Laurence Olivier Award.

Malkovich gained early acclaim for his role as a wounded war veteran in the Robert Benton drama Places in the Heart (1984) for which he was nominated for the Academy Award for Best Supporting Actor. He then played a brilliant but villainous CIA assassin in the Clint Eastwood directed crime drama In the Line of Fire (1993) for which he was nominated for the Academy Award for Best Supporting Actor, the BAFTA Award for Best Actor in a Supporting Role and the Golden Globe Award for Best Supporting Actor – Motion Picture. He played himself in the Spike Jonze directed comedy Being John Malkovich (1999) for which he was nominated for the Actor Award for Outstanding Cast in a Motion Picture. For his role as another cynical CIA assassin in the Martin McDonagh dark comedy Wild Horse Nine (2026) he won the Venice Film Festival's Volpi Cup for Best Actor.

On television, Malkovich played Biff Lowman in the CBS television production of Death of a Salesman (1985) for which he won the Primetime Emmy Award for Outstanding Supporting Actor in a Limited Series or Movie and was nominated for the Golden Globe Award for Best Supporting Actor – Series, Miniseries or Television Film. He also played Kurt in the TNT television film Heart of Darkness (1994) for which she was nominated the Actor Award for Outstanding Actor in a Miniseries or Television Movie and the Golden Globe Award for Best Supporting Actor – Series, Miniseries or Television Film. He portrayed Herman J. Mankiewicz in the HBO television film RKO 281 (1999) and Charles Maurice de Talleyrand-Périgord in the historical miniseries Napoléon (2002) both of which earned him nominations for two Primetime Emmy Awards respectively.

On stage, he portrayed a volatile restaurant manager in the West End revival production of the Lanford Wilson play Burn This (1999) in London for which he received a nomination for the Laurence Olivier Award for Best Actor. For his work Off-Broadway he received two Drama Desk Awards (among five nominations), two Outer Critics Circle Awards and a Theater World Award.

== Major associations ==
=== Academy Awards ===
Year	Category	Nominated work	Result	Ref.
1984	Best Supporting Actor	Places in the Heart	Nominated	
1993	Best Supporting Actor	In the Line of Fire	Nominated	

=== Actor Awards ===
Year	Category	Nominated work	Result	Ref.
1994	Outstanding Actor in a Miniseries or Television Movie	Heart of Darkness	Nominated	
1999	Outstanding Cast in a Motion Picture	Being John Malkovich	Nominated	

=== BAFTA Awards ===
Year	Category	Nominated work	Result	Ref.
British Academy Film Awards
1993	Best Actor in a Supporting Role	In the Line of Fire	Nominated	

=== Emmy Awards ===
Year	Category	Nominated work	Result	Ref.
Primetime Emmy Awards
1985	Outstanding Supporting Actor in a Limited Series or Movie	Death of a Salesman	Won	
2000	Outstanding Supporting Actor in a Limited Series or Movie	RKO 281	Nominated	
2003	Outstanding Supporting Actor in a Limited Series or Movie	Napoléon	Nominated	
News & Documentary Emmy Awards
2010	Outstanding Informational Programming - Long Form	Which Way Home	Won	
Sports Emmy Awards
2018	Outstanding Writing Award	Teasing John Malkovich	Won	

=== Golden Globe Awards ===
Year	Category	Nominated work	Result	Ref.
1985	Best Supporting Actor – Television	Death of a Salesman	Nominated	
1993	Best Supporting Actor – Motion Picture	In the Line of Fire	Nominated	
1994	Best Supporting Actor – Television	Heart of Darkness	Nominated	

=== Laurence Olivier Awards ===
Year	Category	Nominated work	Result	Ref.
1991	Best Actor	Burn This	Nominated	

== Miscellaneous awards ==
Year	Association	Category	Project	Result	Ref.
1984	Boston Society of Film Critics	Best Supporting Actor	Places in the Heart	Won	
1984	Kansas City Film Critics Circle Award	Best Supporting Actor	Places in the Heart	Won	
1984	National Society of Film Critics	Best Supporting Actor	Places in the Heart	Won	
1984	National Board of Review	Best Supporting Actor	Places in the Heart	Won	
1984	Boston Society of Film Critics	Best Supporting Actor	The Killing Fields	Won	
1984	National Society of Film Critics	Best Supporting Actor	The Killing Fields	Won	
1991	Independent Spirit Award	Best Supporting Male	Queens Logic	Nominated	
1993	MTV Movie Award	Best Villain	In the Line of Fire	Nominated	
1993	Saturn Award	Best Supporting Actor	In the Line of Fire	Nominated	
1999	New York Film Critics Circle	Best Supporting Actor	Being John Malkovich	Won	
1999	Chicago Film Critics Association	Best Supporting Actor	Being John Malkovich	Nominated	
2008	St. Louis Gateway Film Critics Association	Best Actor	Burn After Reading	Won	
2008	Globe de Cristal Award	Best Play	Good Canary	Won	
2010	Satellite Award	Best Motion Picture Musical or Comedy	Red	Nominated	
2010	Saturn Award	Best Supporting Actor	Red	Nominated	
2026	Venice International Film Festival	Volpi Cup for Best Actor	Wild Horse Nine	Won	
2026	Santa Barbara International Film Festival	Outstanding Performer of the Year Award	Wild Horse Nine	Won	

== Theater awards ==
Organizations	Year	Award	Category	Result	Ref.
Drama Desk Awards	1983	Outstanding Actor in a Play	True West	Nominated	
Drama Desk Awards	1984	Outstanding Featured Actor in a Play	Death of a Salesman	Won	
Drama Desk Awards	1985	Outstanding Direction of a Play	Balm in Gilead	Won	
Drama Desk Awards	1985	Outstanding Sound Design	Balm in Gilead	Nominated	
Drama Desk Awards	1988	Outstanding Actor in a Play	Burn This	Nominated	
Outer Critics Circle Awards	1984	Outstanding Debut Performance	Death of a Salesman	Won	
Outer Critics Circle Awards	1985	Outstanding Director	Balm in Gilead	Won	
Theater World Awards	1983	Distinguished Performance Award	True West	Won	

== Honorary awards ==
Organizations	Year	Award	Result	Ref.
San Sebastian Film Festival	1998	Lifetime Achievement Award	Honored	
Cairo International Film Festival	1999	Career Achievement Award	Honored	
Republic of Croatia	2003	Order of Danica Hrvatska (Zagreb)	Honored	
Locarno Film Festival	2005	Excellence Award	Honored	
Karlovy Vary International Film Festival	2009	Outstanding Contribution to World Cinema	Honored	
Moscow International Film Festival	2011	Outstanding Contribution to Cinema	Honored	
Munich Film Festival	2011	CineMerit Award	Honored	
Republic of Ukraine	2018	Order of Merit (Ukraine)	Honored	
Zurich Film Festival	2014	Golden Eye Award	Honored	
