= Brian W. Cook =

British film director

- Born: Brian William Cook; Hertfordshire, United Kingdom
- Occupations: Film director, assistant director, producer, actor
- Years active: 1963–present
- Children: 2, Alexandra Kettle Cook & Toby Cook

Brian William Cook is a British film director, assistant director, producer and actor.

== Career ==
Cook has worked as a producer and assistant director on five films with Michael Cimino, three films with Stanley Kubrick and three with Sean Penn. His producing credits include The Pledge, Eyes Wide Shut and Waiting for the Barbarians. In 2005, he directed Colour Me Kubrick starring John Malkovich as Kubrick’s impostor Alan Conway.

== Personal life ==
Cook has two children.

== Filmography ==
=== Films ===
Year	Film	Credited as				
Year	Film	Director	Assistant Director	Producer	Actor (Role)	Production Manager
1965	The Liquidator		Yes			
1966	Alfie		Yes			
1966	The Great St. Trinian's Train Robbery		Yes			
1966	The Deadly Affair		Yes			
1969	Alfred the Great		Yes			
1971	The Last Valley		Yes			
1972	Young Winston		Yes			
1973	The 14		Yes			
1973	The Wicker Man		Yes			
1975	Barry Lyndon		Yes			
1976	Under the Doctor					Yes
1976	Sky Riders		Yes			
1977	Seven Nights in Japan		Yes			
1977	Orca		Yes			
1977	Golden Rendezvous		Yes			
1979	The Kids Are Alright		Yes			
1980	North Sea Hijack		Yes			
1980	Dominique		Yes			
1980	The Shining		Yes			
1980	Making The Shining				Yes	
1980	Flash Gordon		Yes			
1980	Heaven's Gate		Yes			
1981	History of the World: Part I		Yes			
1981	Prisoners			Yes		
1981	Race for the Yankee Zephyr			Yes		
1982	Turkey Shoot			Yes		
1984	Second Time Lucky			Yes		
1985	Hot Target			Yes		
1985	Year of the Dragon		Yes			
1986	King Kong Lives		Yes			
1987	The Sicilian		Yes			
1989	Casualties of War		Yes			
1990	Stella		Yes			
1990	Desperate Hours		Yes			
1991	F/X2		Yes			
1991	Billy Bathgate		Yes			
1992	Christopher Columbus: The Discovery		Yes			
1993	Last Action Hero		Yes			
1993	Nowhere to Run		Yes		Yes	
1994	The Chase					Yes
1995	The Crossing Guard		Yes			
1996	The Sunchaser		Yes			
1999	Eyes Wide Shut		Yes	Yes	Yes	
2000	A Shot at Glory		Yes			
2001	The Pledge		Yes	Yes		
2002	Equilibrium		Yes		Yes	
2004	Churchill: The Hollywood Years		Yes			
2004	Countryfile				Yes	
2005	Colour Me Kubrick	Yes		Yes		
2009	iD3				Yes	
2014	Closer to the Moon		Yes			
2014	The Fault in Our Stars					Yes
2016	The Last Face		Yes			
2017	Life After Flash				Yes	
2019	The Show		Yes			
2019	Waiting for the Barbarians			Yes		
