= In the Presence of Mine Enemies (disambiguation) =

In the Presence of Mine Enemies is a 2003 alternate history novel by Harry Turtledove.

In the Presence of Mine Enemies may also refer to:

- a phrase from Psalm 23:5
- In the Presence of Mine Enemies (Playhouse 90), a 1960 TV play in the Playhouse 90 series
- In the Presence of Mine Enemies (film), a 1997 TV film, a remake of the 1960 TV play
- In the Presence of Mine Enemies (memoir), a 1973 Vietnam War memoir by Howard Rutledge
- In The Presence of Mine Enemies: War in the Heart of America, 1859–1863, nonfiction book by Edward L. Ayers

== See also ==
- In the Presence of My Enemies, a 2003 nonfiction book by Gracia Burnham about her capture by Abu Sayyaf during the Dos Palmas kidnappings
