= Alas, Babylon (Playhouse 90) =

13th episode of the 4th season of Playhouse 90

- Playhouse 90 episode
- Don Murray and Barbara Rush in CBS publicity still for "Alas, Babylon"
- Episode no.: Season 4 Episode 13
- Directed by: Robert Stevens
- Written by: David Shaw
- Original air date: April 3, 1960
- Running time: 90 minutes

Guest appearances
- Don Murray as Randy Bragg; Kim Hunter as Helen Bragg; Dana Andrews as Mark Bragg; Barbara Rush as Liz; Everett Sloane as Dr. Gunn; Rita Moreno as Rita Herndon; Burt Reynolds as Ace

Episode chronology
← Previous "The Hiding Place"	Next → "Journey to the Day"

"Alas, Babylon" is an American television play broadcast on April 3, 1960, as part of the CBS television series, Playhouse 90. It is the thirteenth episode of the fourth season of Playhouse 90.

== Plot ==
A nuclear war is triggered when a young Navy pilot accidentally blows up a port in a foreign country during a time of heightened tensions, and the Soviet Union fires its missiles. The missiles destroy the American Midwest and most of the eastern United States.

The story follows residents of a small Florida town and how they react after learning of a massive nuclear attack that has killed 92% of the world's population.

== Cast ==
- Don Murray as Randy Bragg
- Kim Hunter as Helen Bragg
- Dana Andrews as Mark Bragg
- Barbara Rush as Liz
- Everett Sloane as Dr. Gunn
- Rita Moreno as Rita Herndon
- Burt Reynolds as Ace

== Production ==
Peter Kortner was the producer. Robert Stevens was the director. David Shaw wrote the teleplay, based on the novel, Alas, Babylon by Pat Frank.

A copy of Alas, Babylon is preserved at the UCLA Film and Television Archive. It was transferred from the original 2-inch master tape at the CBS Media Exchange and was shown on March 28, 2015 as part of the 17th Annual Festival of Preservation.

== Reception ==
In The New York Times, John P. Shanley praised the "dramatic efficiency" and "technically excellent presentation," but questioned the judgment of presenting the "unwarranted horror" of a Soviet nuclear attack, all depicted "in chilling detail."

John Crosby of the New York Herald Tribune called it "an excellent production" with " splendid cast."

TV critic Charlie Wadsworth called it "a very shattering and forceful presentation".
