= The Time of Your Life (Playhouse 90) =

- Playhouse 90 episode
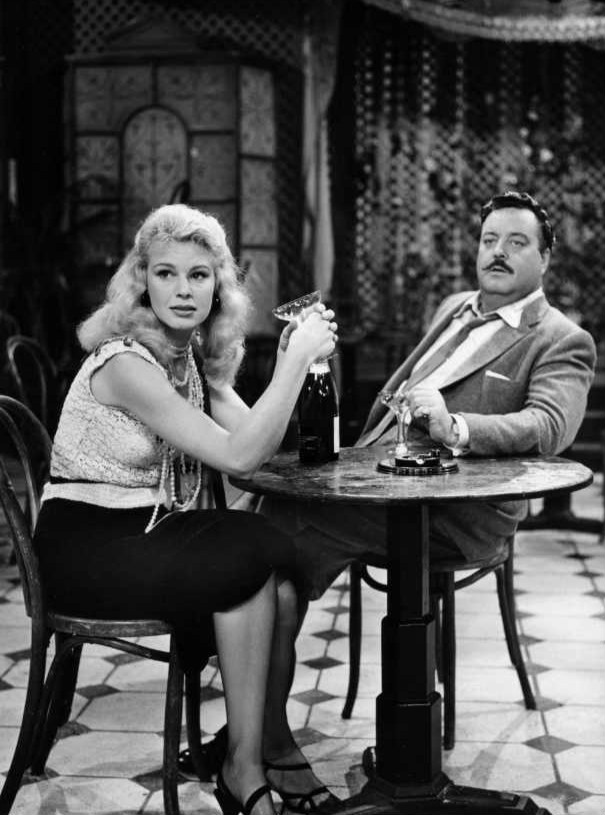
- Betsy Palmer and Jackie Gleason in a scene from the play.
- Episode no.: Season 3 Episode 3
- Directed by: Tom Donovan
- Written by: A. J. Russell (adaptation); William Saroyan; (based on a play by)
- Production code: 082
- Original air date: October 9, 1958

Guest appearance
- Jackie Gleason as Joe

Episode chronology
| ← Previous "Days of Wine and Roses" | Next → "The Long March" |

"The Time of Your Life" is a 1958 live television version of William Saroyan's play starring Jackie Gleason, directed by Tom Donovan, and adapted by A. J. Russell. The telecast was shown on October 9, 1958 and was the third episode of the third season of the anthology series Playhouse 90. The supporting cast features Jack Klugman, Dick York, Betsy Palmer, Bert Freed, Gloria Vanderbilt and Dina Merrill.

== Plot ==
The film follows the adventures of a group of regulars at Nick's 'Pacific Street Saloon, Restaurant and Entertainment Palace' in San Francisco. A sign outside tells people to come in as they are. At the center is the wealthy Joe, who has given up working to hold court at Nick's bar. He desires to live "a civilized life" without hurting anyone and believes the real truth in people is found in their dreams of themselves, not the hard facts of their actual existence.

== Cast ==
- Jackie Gleason as Joe
- Jack Klugman as Nick
- Dick York as Tom
- Betsy Palmer as Kitty Duval
- Bert Freed as Blick
- Gloria Vanderbilt as Elsie
- Dina Merrill as Mary
- Bobby Van as Harry
- Carlos Montalban as The Arab
- James Barton as Kit Carson (Reprising his role from the Cagney film)
- Terry Carter as Wesley
- Lynne Forrester as Friend
- Steve Franken as Willie
- Billy M. Greene as The Drunk
- Ray McHugh as The Newsboy
- Jeri Archer as Killer

== Production ==
=== Development ===
A feature film starring James Cagney had been released a decade earlier.
