= The Long March (Playhouse 90) =

- Playhouse 90 episode
- Jack Carson in "The Long March"
- Episode no.: Season 3 Episode 4
- Directed by: Delbert Mann
- Written by: Roger O. Hirson (adaptation), William Styron (novel)
- Original air date: October 16, 1958
- Running time: 1:28:22

Guest appearances
- Jack Carson as Capt. Al Mannix; Sterling Hayden as Col. Rocky Templeton; Rod Taylor as Lt. Warren Culver

Episode chronology
← Previous "The Time of Your Life"	Next → "Shadows Tremble"

"The Long March" was an American television play broadcast on October 16, 1958, as part of the CBS television series, Playhouse 90.

== Plot ==
Lt. Col. Rocky Thompson orders a group of Marines a 36-mile march after a training mission.

== Cast ==
Edward G. Robinson hosted the broadcast. The cast included the following.

- Jack Carson as Capt. Al Mannix
- Mona Freeman as Betsy Tendler
- Rod Taylor as Lt. Warren Culver
- Sterling Hayden as Lt. Col. Rocky Templeton
- James Congdon as Pvt. Jimmy Hobbs
- Paul Lambert as Major Lawrence
- Harvey Stephens as Col. Price
- Jason Wingreen as Master Sgt. Walter O'Leary
- Fletcher Allen as Pvt. Leadbetter
- Harry Davidson as Capt. Oliphant
- Pauline Meyers as Margaret
- Robert Cass as Headquarters Corporal
- Bob Duggan as Private First Class
- William Benedict as First Private
- Joe Bishop Second Private
- Garry Walberg as Command Post Lieutenant
- Warren Frost as Command Post Sergeant
- Eve McVeagh as Woman in Bar

== Production ==
The program aired on October 16, 1958, on the CBS television series Playhouse 90. It was written by Roger O. Hirson, based on William Styron's novel. Fred Coe was the producer and Delbert Mann the director.
