= Word from a Sealed-Off Box =

- Playhouse 90 episode
- Maria Schell and Jean-Pierre Aumont in "Word From a Sealed-Off Box"
- Episode no.: Season 3 Episode 6
- Directed by: Franklin Schaffner
- Written by: Mayo Smith (adaptation), Henriette Roosenburg (book)
- Original air date: October 30, 1958

Guest appearances
- Maria Schell as Gret; Jean-Pierre Aumont as Harry

Episode chronology
| ← Previous "Shadows Tremble" | Next → "Heart of Darkness" |

"Word From a Sealed-Off Box" was an American television play that was broadcast on October 30, 1958, as part of the CBS television series, Playhouse 90.

== Plot ==
A courier for the Dutch underground is captured during World War I.

== Cast ==
The cast included the following.

- Maria Schell as Gret
- Jean-Pierre Aumont as Harry
- Vivian Nathan as Frieda
- Betsy Von Furstenberg as Lisa
- Theodore Bikel as Rapp

== Production ==
The program aired on October 30, 1958, on the CBS television series Playhouse 90. Mayo Smith wrote the teleplay based on the book, "The Walls Came Tumbling Down" by Henriette Roosenburg. Fred Coe was the producer and Franklin Schaffner the director.
