= Journey to the Day =

14th episode of the 4th season of Playhouse 90

- Playhouse 90 episode
- Episode no.: Season 4 Episode 14
- Directed by: John Frankenheimer
- Written by: Roger O. Hirson
- Original air date: April 22, 1960
- Running time: 90 minutes

Guest appearances
- Steven Hill as Dr. Gutera; Mary Astor as Helen; James Dunn as Mr. Cooper; James Gregory as Dr. Endicott; Vivian Nathan as Martha; Mike Nichols as Arthur Millman; Janice Rule as Katherine; David J. Stewart as Dr. Sobik; Peter Votrian as Billy; Helen Kleeb as nurse

Episode chronology
← Previous "Alas, Babylon"	Next → "The Shape of the River"

"Journey to the Day" is an American television play broadcast on April 22, 1960, as part of the CBS television series, Playhouse 90. It is the fourteenth episode of the fourth season of Playhouse 90.

== Plot ==
Dr. Gutera is assigned to lead group therapy at a state mental hospital. The play covers several group sessions with six patients: Katherine, a highly intelligent schizophrenic woman; Arthur, a talkative actor suffering from manic-depressive disorder; Martha, who is catatonic; Mr. Cooper, a con man sent to the asylum by the court; Billy, a delusional teenager committed to the asylum by his mother; and Helen, a housewife suffering from depression.

== Cast ==
- Steven Hill as Dr. Gutera
- Mary Astor as Helen
- James Dunn as Mr. Cooper
- James Gregory as Dr. Endicott
- Vivian Nathan as Martha
- Mike Nichols as Arthur Millman
- Janice Rule as Katherine
- David J. Stewart as Dr. Sobik
- Peter Votrian as Billy
- Helen Kleeb as the nurse

== Production ==
Fred Coe was the producer. He made a pitch to produce a drama on the subject of mental health. Roger O. Hirson was hired to write the teleplay with John Bartlow Martin serving as a consultant on mental health issues. Hirson conducted research at the Columbus State Hospital in Ohio and at St. Vincent's Hospital in New York. To ensure accuracy, Hirson's script was submitted for review to the American Psychiatric Association and the National Association for Mental Health. The production required a year of production time.

John Frankenheimer was later brought in to direct. The music was composed by Jerry Goldsmith.

Due to producer Coe's obligations in Hollywood, the production was taped there. The play was rehearsed for two weeks in New York and continued on a jet flight to California.

== Reception ==
Cyntia Lowry of the Associated Press Fran Swaebly of The Miami Herald found it be "too real to be real."
