= The Shape of the River =

15th episode of the 4th season of Playhouse 90

- Playhouse 90 episode
- Episode no.: Season 4 Episode 15
- Directed by: Boris Sagal
- Written by: Horton Foote
- Original air date: May 2, 1960

Guest appearances
- Franchot Tone as Samuel Clemens; Leif Erickson as William Dean Howells; Katharine Bard as Livy Clemens; Shirley Knight as Susy Clemens; Jane McArthur as Jane Clemens

Episode chronology
← Previous "Journey to the Day"	Next → "In the Presence of Mine Enemies"

"The Shape of the River" is an American television play broadcast on May 2, 1960, as part of the CBS television series, Playhouse 90. It is the fifteenth episode of the fourth season of Playhouse 90.

== Plot ==
The play examines the life of Samuel Clemens (Mark Twain) from 1895, shortly before he departed on a European speaking tour, to 1905. During these years, Twain fell deeply into debt, and wife suffered a nervous breakdown and died. Daughter Susy became insane and died of spinal meningitis, and daughter Jane had a heart attack and drowned in a bathtub.

== Cast ==
- Franchot Tone as Samuel Clemens
- Leif Erickson as William Dean Howells
- Katharine Bard as Livy Clemens
- Shirley Knight as Susy Clemens
- Jane McArthur as Jane Clemens

== Production ==
Fred Coe was the producer. Boris Sagal was the director, and Horton Foote wrote the teleplay. Foote had studied Twain's works since childhood and conducted extensive research before writing the screenplay.

== Reception ==
Fred Danzig of the UPI praised the performances of Bard and Tone.

Cynthia Lowry of the Associated Press called it "a poignant and in some ways slow-moving play."

Critic Paul King praised Tone's performance as "masterful" and the best of his career, though he found other performances mediocre and the production "disturbingly erratic".
