= Shadows Tremble =

- Playhouse 90 episode
- Frank Conroy and Edward G. Robinson in Shadows Tremble
- Episode no.: Season 3 Episode 5
- Directed by: Herbert Hirschman
- Written by: Ernest Kinoy
- Original air date: October 23, 1958
- Running time: 1:29:21

Guest appearances
- Edward G. Robinson as Oscar Bromek; Ray Walston as Lyle Partridge; Beatrice Straight as Grace Tyburn

Episode chronology
← Previous "The Long March"	Next → "Word From a Sealed-Off Box"

"Shadows Tremble" was an American television movie that was broadcast on October 23, 1958, as part of the CBS television series, Playhouse 90.

== Plot ==
Toymaker Oscar Bromek, an immigrant, retires to a small town in Vermont where he struggles to fit in.

== Cast ==
The cast included the following.

- Edward G. Robinson as Oscar Bromek
- Ray Walston as Lyle Partridge
- Beatrice Straight as Grace Tyburn
- Frank Conroy as John Tyburn
- Parker Fennelly as George Putnam
- Robert Webber as Malcolm Field
- John Hoyt as the Middle Selectman
- Lori March as Felicia Field
- Walter Baldwin as the Left Selectman

== Production ==
The program aired on October 23, 1958, on the CBS television series Playhouse 90. It was written by Ernest Kinoy. Herbert Brodkin was the producer and Herbert Hirschman the director.
