= Bernard Kates =

American actor (1922–2010)

- Born: December 26, 1922; Boston, Massachusetts
- Died: February 2, 2010 (aged 87); Lake Havasu City, Arizona
- Occupation: actor
- Years active: 1949–1999

Bernard Kates (December 26, 1922 – February 2, 2010) was an American actor on television, in movies and on the stage.

Staff Sergeant Kates served as a waist gunner on a B-17G with the 336th Bomb Squadron, 95th Bomb Group (H), 8th United States AAF during World War II, Kates earned an Air Medal with three clusters and a Distinguished Flying Cross.

A life member of The Actors Studio, Kates's film appearances include Judgment at Nuremberg (as Max Perkins), The Babe, and The Phantom.

One of his many television roles was as Sigmund Freud in the Star Trek: The Next Generation episode "Phantasms". He also portrayed a Jewish resistance fighter in the 1960 television play In the Presence of Mine Enemies (Playhouse 90).

Kates' Broadway credits include The Devils (1965), Have I Got a Girl for You! (1963), The Disenchanted (1958), Billy Budd (1951), and At War With the Army (1949). He was a resident actor with the Great Lakes Shakespeare Festival in Cleveland, Ohio, for nine summers, and he was also active in "a noteworthy run of shows" at the Pacific Conservatory of the Performing Arts in Santa Maria, California.

On February 2, 2010, complications resulting from sepsis and pneumonia led to Kates' death in a hospital in Lake Havasu City, Arizona, at age 87.

== Filmography ==
| Year | Title | Role | Notes |
|---|---|---|---|
| 1951 | You're in the Navy Now | Tugboat Sailor | Uncredited |
| 1960 | Twelve Hours to Kill | Desk Editor | |
| 1960 | Alfred Hitchcock Presents | Little Man | Season 6 Episode 7: "Outlaw in Town" |
| 1961 | Alfred Hitchcock Presents | Lou Heinz | Season 6 Episode 38: "Ambition" |
| 1961 | Alfred Hitchcock Presents | George Lassiter (the Witness) | Season 7 Episode 11: "The Right Kind of Medicine" |
| 1961 | Judgment at Nuremberg | Max Perkins | |
| 1974 | The Super Cops | Heller | |
| 1992 | The Babe | Colonel Jacob (Jake) Ruppert | |
| 1992 | Seedpeople | Doc Roller | |
| 1996 | The Phantom | Falkmoore the Butler | |
| 1996 | Robo Warriors | Charlie Walters | |
