= Vivian Nathan =

American actress (1916–2015)

- Born: Vivian Firko; October 26, 1916; New York City, U.S.
- Died: April 3, 2015 (aged 98); Englewood, New Jersey U.S.
- Occupation: Actress
- Spouse: Nathan Schwalb (1944-2000, his death)

Vivian Nathan (born Vivian Firko, October 26, 1916 – April 3, 2015) was an American actress and founding member of the Actors Studio, which opened in 1947. She served on the Actors Studio's board of directors until 1999. She appeared in the original Broadway debut productions of The Rose Tattoo (1951) and Camino Real (1953). Her film credits included Klute.

== Early years ==
Nathan was born in Manhattan on October 26, 1916, to Hipolit and Anna Firko. The family soon relocated to Maspeth, Queens, where Vivian attended Holy Cross Parochial School. She later attended the St. Nicholas school on Manhattan's Lower East Side.

== Stage ==
In 1944, Vivian caught the eye of John Golden, a theater producer who was auditioning aspiring stage actors. Still performing under the name Firko, she made her Broadway debut under Elia Kazan's direction in 1948, in the Actors Studio production of Bessie Breuer's Sundown Beach. The decision to employ her husband Nathan Schwalb's given name as Firko's stage name appears to have taken place sometime between casting and opening night in the 1949 production of Montserrat, Lillian Hellman's adaptation of the Emmanuel Roblès play.

Nathan became an original member of the Actors Studio when it was founded in 1947 by Elia Kazan and Lee Strasberg. She also worked as acting instructor and session moderator at the Studio. Her students included the late actress, Kim Stanley. Vivian Nathan served on the Actor Studio's board of directors until 1999, alongside Ellen Burstyn, Lee Grant, Paul Newman, Al Pacino, and Estelle Parsons.

In 1951, Nathan was cast in the original Broadway opening of Tennessee Williams' The Rose Tattoo, co-starring together with Martin Balsam, Maureen Stapleton, and Eli Wallach. She re-teamed with Martin Balsam for 1953's Camino Real, directed by Elia Kazan.

Nathan received a Clarence Derwent Award in 1955 for her role as the Charwoman in Anastasia. Roughly one week after that play's Broadway opening, entertainment writer Ed Sullivan devoted several paragraphs of his syndicated column to a profile of Nathan, which concluded with the actress stating:

I think that whatever small success I've had is because of my great good fortune in having lived among the old Polish men and women of peasant stock. All of them had deep faith in their religion and they were simple, believing people. The roles in which I have done best are exactly that type. I understand those characterizations because they made me familiar with their accaptance of sorrow and tragedy.

Nathan portrayed a Holocaust survivor in The Investigation in 1966. In 1977, Nathan co-starred opposite Anne Bancroft in the play Golda, directed by Arthur Penn. Her other Broadway credits include The Watering Place, Semi-Detached, and The Lovers.

== Film ==
Nathan made her film debut in the 1958 romantic comedy Teacher's Pet, starring Clark Gable. She appeared in the crime drama The Young Savages and The Outsider, in which she played Tony Curtis' mother. She gave a notable performance as Jane Fonda's psychiatrist in the 1971 crime thriller Klute.

== Television ==
Nathan appeared "The Last Summer" episode of Studio One, two episodes of Alfred Hitchcock Presents, and in three episodes of Playhouse 90 including "The Violent Heart" (1958), "Word From a Sealed-Off Box" (1958), and "Journey to the Day" (1960). In 1967, she appeared in the color teleplay, The Investigation.

== Death ==
Nathan died at the Lillian Booth Actors Home in Englewood, New Jersey on April 3, 2015, at the age of 98. Her late husband, Nathan Schwalb, whom she had been married to for more than 50 years, died in 2000. Nathan's memorial service was held at Riverside Memorial Chapel on the Upper West Side of Manhattan on April 12, 2015.

== Awards and honors ==
- 1955: Clarence Derwent Award for her portrayal of the Charwoman in Anastasia, directed by Alan Schneider

== Filmography ==
Vivian Nathan film and television credits
| Year | Title | Role | Notes | Ref. |
|---|---|---|---|---|
| 1956–1958 | Studio One | (various) | 7 episodes | |
| 1958 | Studio One | Mrs. Wales | Episode: "The Last Summer" (S10.E41) | |
| 1958 | Teacher's Pet | Edna Kovac | Film | |
| 1958 | Playhouse 90 | Annette | Episode: "The Violent Heart" (S2.E22) | |
| 1958 | Playhouse 90 | Frieda | Episode: "Word From a Sealed-Off Box" (S3.E6) | |
| 1958 | Alfred Hitchcock Presents | Margaret Goames | Episode: "Fatal Figures" (S3.E29) | |
| 1960 | Playhouse 90 | Martha Kowalski | Episode: "Journey to the Day" (S4.E15) | |
| 1961 | The Young Savages | Mrs. Escalante | Film | |
| 1961 | The Outsider | Nancy Hayes | Film | |
| 1961 | Alfred Hitchcock Presents | Elise 'Elsie' Thompson | Episode: "Final Arrangements" (S6.E36) | |
| 1967 | The Investigation | | Teleplay | |
| 1971 | Klute | Psychiatrist | Film | |
| 1976 | Kojak | Mrs. Coletti | 1 episode | |
| 1989 | The Equalizer | Mrs. Drake | Episode: "Lullaby of Darkness" | |
