= The Hiding Place (Playhouse 90) =

12th episode of the 4th season of Playhouse 90

- Playhouse 90 episode
- Episode no.: Season 4 Episode 12
- Directed by: Sidney Lumet
- Written by: Adrian Spies
- Original air date: March 22, 1960

Guest appearances
- James Mason as Hans Frick; Richard Basehart as Martin Lambert; Trevor Howard as Robert Wilson; Kim Hunter as Maria; Helmut Dantine as Colonel

Episode chronology
| ← Previous "Tomorrow" | Next → "Alas, Babylon" |

"The Hiding Place" is an American television play broadcast on March 22, 1960, as part of the CBS television series, Playhouse 90. It is the twelfth episode of the fourth season of Playhouse 90.

== Plot ==
For six years following the end of World War II, a deluded and neurotic German clerk, Hans Frick, has held two British fliers as prisoners in his cellar. Frick cared for the fliers, sometimes with true kindness, but kept them imprisoned and ignorant of the war's conclusion. The fliers spend their time recalling the past and dreaming of escape. One of the fliers works on a book of his boyhood recollections.

Frick is stricken with a heart attack and releases his fliers. He feels a bond with the fliers and begs to be allowed to stay with them as their servant in England.

== Cast ==
- James Mason as Hans Frick
- Richard Basehart as Martin Lambert
- Trevor Howard as Robert Wilson
- Kim Hunter as Maria
- Helmut Dantine as Colonel

== Production ==
Sidney Lumet was the director. Adrian Spies wrote the teleplay, which was adapted from an English novel by Robert Shaw.

== Reception ==
Kay Gardella in the New York Daily News called it a "well-acted, taut live TV drama."

Aleene Barnes of the Los Angeles Times Wrote that it "hit the mark solidly". She also praised Mason for creating a character who both demanded the viewer's compassion and aroused hatred for his cruel deeds.

Critic Ogden Dwight called it "a remarkable television exploit" and the most distinguished installment of Playhouse 90 of the season. He also praised Mason's performance as "a masterpiece of creative acting."

Fred Remington in The Pittsburgh Press praised the performances of Mason, Basehart, and Howard, and called the production "a strange excursion into madness."
