= Colour Me Kubrick =

2006 film by Brian Cook

- Theatrical release poster
- Directed by: Brian Cook
- Written by: Anthony Frewin
- Produced by: Michael Fitzgerald; Brian Cook
- Starring: John Malkovich
- Cinematography: Howard Atherton
- Edited by: Alan Strachan
- Music by: Bryan Adams
- Production companies: Canal+ Isle of Man Film; Colour Me K Limited; First Choice Films; TPS Star
- Distributed by: EuropaCorp; Magnolia Pictures
- Release dates: 6 October 2005 (Dinard Festival of British Cinema); 4 January 2006 (France)
- Running time: 86 minutes
- Countries: United Kingdom; France
- Language: English
- Box office: $497,009

Colour Me Kubrick: A True...ish Story (U.S. title: Color Me Kubrick) is a 2005 comedy-drama film directed by Brian W. Cook and written by Anthony Frewin. It stars John Malkovich as Alan Conway, a British con-man who impersonated director Stanley Kubrick for several years in the 1990s. The film follows a fictionalized version of Conway as he goes from person to person, convincing them to give out money, liquor, and sexual favours for the promise of a job on "Kubrick's" next film. In real life, Frewin was Kubrick's long-time personal assistant, and Cook was assistant director on three of Kubrick's films.

== Plot ==
Two thugs come to collect a bar bill that conman Alan Conway has generated while impersonating the reclusive film director Stanley Kubrick, but Conway is nowhere to be found, as he provided the address of a wealthy elderly couple as Kubrick's home address. The thugs cause a ruckus outside the house and are arrested.

Conway scams many people by saying he is Kubrick, including a young fashion designer, the managers of an aspiring heavy metal band, a cab driver, and the owner of a fashionable wine bar. The victims are deceived into giving "Kubrick" sums of money, free food and drinks, and even sexual favours. None of these people catch on to the fact that Conway actually knows relatively little about Kubrick or his films, and he puts on a different persona – ranging from reserved English gentleman to flamboyant Jewish-American stereotype – with each victim. The only person Conway fails to deceive is a rent boy who he attempts to pick up at a bar: when Conway begins an anecdote about directing Judgment at Nuremberg (1961) after the young man says it is his favourite of Kubrick's films, the rent boy informs him that Judgment at Nuremberg was directed by Stanley Kramer – not Kubrick – and Conway quietly leaves.

In a restaurant, a drunk Conway confronts Frank Rich, a journalist from The New York Times, about an article the Times ran about the real Kubrick. He acts personally offended that the paper called Kubrick a recluse, and wants Rich to know that he shaved off his beard. After this chance meeting, Rich investigates Kubrick and finds a picture of him, learning that the real Kubrick looks nothing like the man he met in the restaurant.

The nurse who cares for Conway after he passes out, drunk, on a beach, introduces him to the popular British singer and comedian Lee Pratt, and Conway is able to ingratiate himself with Pratt by promising to help establish the "low-rent Liberace with an Elvis gleam in his eye" as a headlining act in Las Vegas. Conway travels around with Pratt, living a life of luxury at Pratt's expense in exchange for invented tips and false promises about helping the entertainer conquer America. Finally, in a high-class seaside hotel in Devon, a cleaning woman, possibly under the direction of Pratt's increasingly suspicious manager, discovers a passport with Conway's real name printed inside, and Conway is thrown out of Pratt's life and off of a pier into Lyme Bay.

Rich writes an article exposing Conway, and reporters gather outside Conway's apartment. In an attempt to avoid prosecution, Conway acts as though he really thinks he is Stanley Kubrick and is sent to a mental hospital, where his doctor publishes a case study of him in a medical journal. He convinces the doctor he has recovered from his mental breakdown, but she says he still needs treatment for his alcoholism and arranges for the National Health Service to pay for him to attend a four-week program at the luxurious Rimini Clinic, where many celebrities go for rehab.

Conway lives the good life at the clinic. Over a still frame of him relaxing in a giant, luxurious hot tub, onscreen text reveals that he "escaped prosecution. He returned to his flat in Harrow, where he died of a heart attack in December 1998. Stanley Kubrick died three months later."

== Cast ==
- John Malkovich as Alan Conway
- Jack Ryan as Steve
- Burn Gorman as Willie
- Leslie Phillips as Freddie
- Honor Blackman as Madam
- Luke Mably as Rupert Rodnight
- Maynard Eziashi as Adibe
- Enzo Cilenti as PC Waldegrave
- Joe Van Moyland as Spencer
- Sam Redford as Toby
- Head-On as Exterminating Angels
- Angus Barnett as Ace
- Nitin Ganatra as Deepak
- Phil Cornwell as Duty Sgt.
- Bryan Dick as Sean
- Jeremy Turner-Welch as David
- Tom Allen as Charles
- Paul Burnham as Hex Mortimer
- Jamie Davis as Duane
- Mark Umbers as Piers
- Henry Goodman as Mordecai
- Richard E. Grant as Jasper
- James Faulkner as Oliver
- Rebecca Front as Maureen
- Nolan Hemmings as Butch Roberts
- Nick Barber as Denzil
- John Leyton as Lord Charles Benson
- Shaun Dingwall as Maitre'd
- Marisa Berenson as Alix Rich
- William Hootkins as Frank Rich
- Marc Warren as Hud
- Robert Powell as Robert
- James Dreyfus as Melvyn
- Jim Davidson as Lee Pratt
- Terence Rigby as Norman
- Peter Bowles as Cyril
- Lynda Baron as Mrs Vitali
- Ayesha Dharker as Dr Stukeley
- Ken Russell as nightgown man
- Peter Sallis as 2nd patient
- Linda Bassett as trolley lady
- Shaun Parkes as 3rd patient
- Marion O'Dwyer as Irish Staff Nurse

== Production ==
The idea for Colour Me Kubrick was conceived during the filming of Eyes Wide Shut (1999). Alan Conway had already been impersonating Kubrick for many years by that point, but it was during the filming of Eyes Wide Shut that the director became aware of the situation. Kubrick's assistant, Anthony Frewin, received calls and complaints from various people who had met with Conway while he was impersonating Kubrick and were offered money, gifts, or even parts in upcoming films. Frewin brought this information to Kubrick, who asked him to find those affected. Very little progress was made in reprimanding Conway, however, because none of the people who were conned would come forward. Frewin decided to write these accounts and stories into a screenplay, which went on to become Colour Me Kubrick.

Brian Cook, an assistant director who worked with Kubrick on three films, including Eyes Wide Shut, read Frewin's script and enjoyed it. Cook also knew of Conway's actions, and how they affected Kubrick's work and personal life. He mentioned that one of the worst incidents was "when he signed Stanley's name on a bank loan for a gay club in Soho". The film marked Cook's debut as a director.

== Soundtrack ==
There are several musical references to the films of Stanley Kubrick on the film's soundtrack: both Richard Strauss's Also Sprach Zarathustra and Johann Strauss II's "On the Beautiful Blue Danube" were featured in 2001: A Space Odyssey (1968); both "Ode to Joy" from Ludwig van Beethoven's Ninth Symphony and Gioacchino Rossini's The Thieving Magpie were featured in A Clockwork Orange (1971), and the sarabande of George Frideric Handel's Keyboard Suite in D minor was featured in Barry Lyndon (1975). The version of "Midnight, the Stars and You" by Ray Noble and His Orchestra with Al Bowlly is featured during the closing credits of both this film and The Shining (1980), but does not appear on Colour Me Kubrick's soundtrack album.

=== Track listing ===
Colour Me Kubrick: Original Soundtrack (EuropaCorp – RMF002)

1. Richard Strauss / The City of Prague Philharmonic conducted by Paul Bateman – "Also Sprach Zarathustra" (1:51)
2. Ludwig van Beethoven / Mark Ayres – "Ode to Joy" (5:34)
3. Tom Jones – "Not Responsible" (2:09)
4. Bryan Adams – "I'm Not the Man You Think I Am" (3:02)
5. Erika Eigen – "I Want to Marry a Lighthouse Keeper" (2:07)
6. Jim Davidson – "Hello" (3:56)
7. The Glenn Miller Orchestra – "Twilight Time" (3:31)
8. Bryan Adams – "It's All About Me" (1:32)
9. Laurence Cottle – "Flipside" (3:32)
10. Teddy Lasry – "Night Walking" (3:19)
11. Gioacchino Rossini / Staatsphilharmonie Rheinland-Pfalz conducted by Kurt Redel – "The Thieving Magpie" (10:38)
12. Georg Friedrich Händel / The City of Prague Philharmonic conducted by Paul Bateman – "Sarabande" (4:06)
13. Johann Strauss Jr. / The City of Prague Philharmonic conducted by Paul Bateman – "On the Beautiful Blue Danube" (10:02)

=== Colour Me Kubrick (Bryan Adams EP) ===
Colour Me Kubrick

Soundtrack album by Bryan Adams
- Released: 2005
- Recorded: 2002
- Genres: Rock; soft rock
- Label: Universal

Bryan Adams chronology
Room Service (2004)	Colour Me Kubrick (2005)	Anthology (2005)

In 2005, Bryan Adams released an EP titled Colour Me Kubrick, which consisted of five songs written for and included in the film.

==== Track listing ====
No.	Title	Writer(s)	Length
1.	"I'm Not the Man You Think I Am"	Bryan Adams, Gretchen Peters
2.	"It's All About Me"	Adams, Peters
3.	"Rely on Me"	Adams, Eliot Kennedy
4.	"Too Good to Be True"	Adams, Kennedy
5.	"Gift of Love"	Adams, Kennedy, Matthias Gohl

== Release ==
Colour Me Kubrick was released in 2006 in various countries (France, Russia, Portugal) and on 23 March 2007 in the United States.

== Critical reception ==
On the review aggregator website Rotten Tomatoes, 51% of 59 critics' reviews of the film are positive, with an average rating of 5.5/10; the site's "critics consensus" reads: "Colour Me Kubrick has a fascinating premise, but provides little insight into Kubrick and the man who impersonated him." On Metacritic, the film has a weighted average score of 57 of 100 based on reviews from 21 critics, indicating "mixed or average" reviews.

In Variety Lisa Nesselson called the film an "enormously entertaining romp", writing "pic is laid out so it's also completely accessible to viewers who know next-to-nothing about the real Kubrick save his profession. .. [its] subtext about the power of celebrity nicely exploits the fact that Conway was able to pass himself off as Kubrick without taking the trouble even to memorize his own alleged filmography or to see the films."

Jason Solomons in The Guardian wrote: "John Malkovich delivers a performance that's flamboyant by even his standards. ... It's great fun, and director Brian Cook, who spent 30 years as Kubrick's assistant director, cleverly steals shots from the master and uses music from A Clockwork Orange and 2001 to accompany Conway on his flights of fancy".

Stephen Holden wrote in the New York Times: "Even if it doesn't add up to more than a fitfully amusing collection of comic sketches, Color Me Kubrick ... is a platform for John Malkovich to burst into lurid purple flame."

The Hollywood Reporter wrote: "Color Me Kubrick is at best a kitschy Catch Me If You Can and at worst a tedious comedy that grows more tiresome by every self-consciously irreverent minute. ... This John Malkovich vehicle strains for something droll, but the best it can muster up is a glib ennui that proves anything but colorful."

Tasha Robinson of The A.V. Club wrote that the film "literally only has one idea in its head, and when that idea runs dry, it's as lost as Conway is without his plethora of Kubrick masks." More positively, Brian Tallerico of UGO said that "even if the film is essentially a one-man show, a one-man show starring John Malkovich is bound to be really damn good."

Jim Emerson, writing for RogerEbert.com, gave the film two and a half stars out of four, and said: "Color Me Kubrick is a little bit like a coloring book — flip the pages and each is pretty much like the one before, escalating variations on the same scam, with Malkovich filling in the cartoonish shadings, and occasionally going way outside the lines. It's an entertaining diversion on a rainy afternoon, but not something you're likely to still be thinking about a week from Thursday".

Stephen Hunter of The Washington Post described the film as a "nice, deep, clear cocktail of ammonia on the rocks: bracing, comic, astonishing". He also praised the film for its sharp, caustic humour while noting the toxic edge beneath its stylish surface.
