= 100 Years (film) =

2115 film by Robert Rodriguez

- Promotional poster
- Directed by: Robert Rodriguez
- Written by: John Malkovich
- Starring: John Malkovich; Shuya Chang; Gedeon Manlulu; Marko Zaror
- Cinematography: Claudio Miranda
- Edited by: Robert Rodriguez
- Production companies: Kouz Production; Moonwalk Films; Double R Productions
- Distributed by: Sholom Gelt Films
- Release date: November 18, 2115
- Countries: France; United States
- Language: English

100 Years is an upcoming experimental science fiction short film written by and starring John Malkovich and directed by Robert Rodriguez. The film was produced by the French company Rémy Martin to promote Louis XIII, their cognac that takes 100 years to create, and locked in a safe for a century. Advertised in 2015 with the tagline "The Movie You Will Never See", it is scheduled to be released on November 18, 2115. The film stars an international ensemble cast, with American actor John Malkovich, Chinese actress Shuya Chang, Filipino actor Gedeon Manlulu and Chilean actor Marko Zaror.

According to Rodriguez, 100 years is short-form. He stated in a 2019 interview:

I was making several short films for them, and I finished that one first, we shot that one first, I thought that was gonna be a commercial or something. And then I showed them the movie and they said, "Yeah, that's great, that's great. That's the one we lock away." And I said, "What? That's the one you lock away? What about the other one with the future..." "No, that's the commercial."

== Cast ==
While the details of the film have been kept highly secret, the names of three actors have been released:

- John Malkovich
- Shuya Chang
- Gedeon Manlulu
- Marko Zaror
- Khalid Siddiqui

== Production ==
Malkovich and Rodriguez announced in November 2015 that they had teamed with Louis XIII Cognac, owned by Rémy Martin, to create a film inspired by the hundred years it takes to make a bottle of Louis XIII. Although the film's plot remains a complete secret and enforced by a nondisclosure agreement, on November 18, 2015, Malkovich and Rodriguez released three teaser trailers: Retro, Nature, and Future.

== Release ==
Pending release, the film is being kept in a high-tech safe behind bulletproof glass that will open automatically on November 18, 2115, the day of the film's premiere. One thousand guests from around the world, including Malkovich and Rodriguez, have received a pair of invitation tickets made of metal for the premiere, which they can hand down to their descendants. The safe in which 100 Years is kept was showcased at the 2016 Cannes Film Festival and various other cities before being returned to Cognac, France and the Louis XIII cellars.

== Related ==
A song, "100 Years", is said by Louis XIII Cognac to have been composed for them by Pharrell Williams and performed live, once, at a private party. Louis XIII Cognac has promised that a recording of the song will be issued in 2117.

== See also ==
- Future Library
- Once Upon a Time in Shaolin, 2015 studio album by Wu-Tang Clan, of which only one copy exists
