= Heart of Darkness (1994 film) =

1993 American TV film by Nicolas Roeg

- UK VHS cover
- Based on: Heart of Darkness by Joseph Conrad
- Written by: Benedict Fitzgerald
- Directed by: Nicolas Roeg
- Starring: Tim Roth; John Malkovich; Isaach De Bankolé; James Fox; Phoebe Nicholls
- Composer: Stanley Myers

Production
- Producers: Luc Roeg; Rick Rosenberg; Robert W. Christiansen
- Cinematography: Anthony B. Richmond
- Editor: Louise Rubacky
- Running time: 100 minutes

Original release
- Network: TNT
- Release: March 13, 1994

Heart of Darkness is a 1994 television film adaptation of Joseph Conrad’s famous 1899 novella written by Benedict Fitzgerald, directed by Nicolas Roeg, and starring Tim Roth, John Malkovich, Isaach De Bankolé and James Fox.

It is the third screen adaptation of the novella, following a 1958 television adaptation for the anthology series Playhouse 90 starring Boris Karloff, and 1979's Apocalypse Now with Marlon Brando, which loosely adapted it and updated it to the Vietnam War.

The film was filmed as a co-production with Ted Turner's Turner Pictures, and then aired by his TNT network on March 13, 1994.

== Plot ==
Seaman Captain Charles Marlow is sent up the Congo River to retrieve cargo, and along the way, learns of the successful and enigmatic trader Kurtz, who is worshiped as a god by the natives.

== Cast ==
- Tim Roth as Marlow
- John Malkovich as Kurtz
- Isaach De Bankolé as Mfumu
- James Fox as Gosse
- Phoebe Nicholls as The Intended
- Morten Faldaas as Harlequin
- Alan Corduner as Verne
- Patrick Ryecart as De Griffe
- Michael Fitzgerald as Harou
- Geoffrey Hutchings as Delcommune
- Iman as Black Beauty
- Ian McDiarmid as doctor
- Peter Vaughan as director
- John Savident as company director

== Awards ==
The film won and was nominated for several awards, including:

- Primetime Emmy for Sound Editing as 1994 (Won)
- CableABC Award for Art Direction as 1995 (Won)
- CableABC Award for Costume Design as 1995 (Nominated)

Malkovich was nominated for both a Screen Actors Guild Award and a Golden Globe for Best Actor in 1995.
