= John Malkovich =

American actor (born 1953)

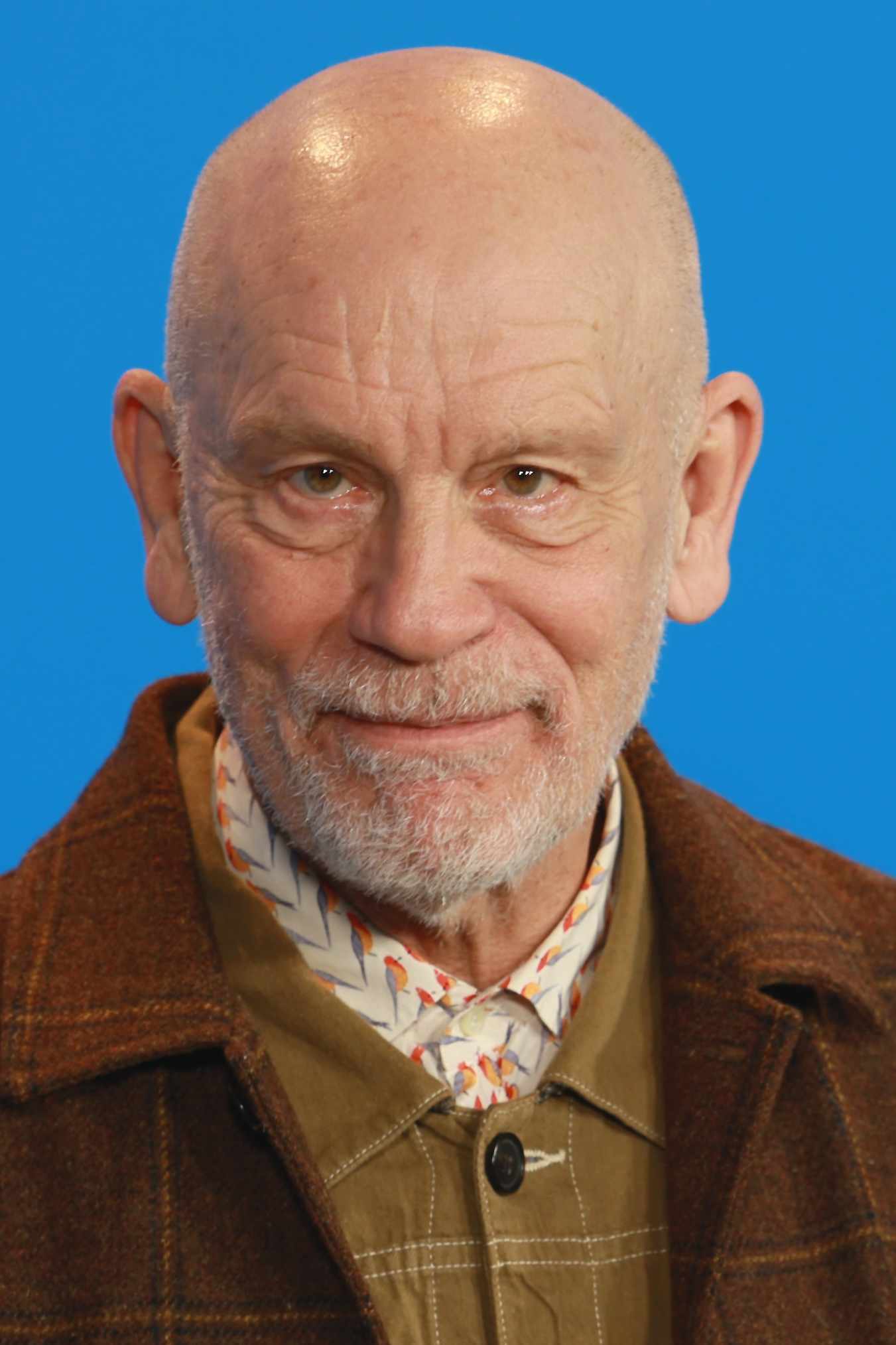
- Malkovich in 2023
- Born: John Gavin Malkovich; December 9, 1953 (age 72); Christopher, Illinois, U.S.
- Citizenship: United States; Croatia
- Education: William Esper Studio
- Occupation: Actor
- Years active: 1976–present
- Works: Full list
- Spouse: Glenne Headly (m. 1982; div. 1988)
- Partner: Nicoletta Peyran (1989–present)
- Children: 2
- Awards: Full list

John Gavin Malkovich (born December 9, 1953) is an American actor. Known for his performances as eccentric and amoral characters, his accolades include three Emmy Awards and a Volpi Cup, with nominations for two Academy Awards, a BAFTA Award, three Golden Globes, and a Laurence Olivier Award.

Malkovich started his career as a charter member of the Steppenwolf Theatre Company in Chicago in 1976. He moved to New York City, acting in a Steppenwolf production of the Sam Shepard play True West (1982). He made his Broadway debut as Biff in the revival of the Arthur Miller play Death of a Salesman (1984), reprising the role in a television film adaptation the next year, for which he won the Primetime Emmy Award for Outstanding Supporting Actor in a Limited Series or Movie. He directed the Harold Pinter play The Caretaker (1986), and acted in Lanford Wilson's Burn This (1987), the latter gaining him a Laurence Olivier Award for Best Actor nomination when it transferred to the West End in 1990.

Malkovich won the Volpi Cup for Best Actor for his performance as a CIA officer in Wild Horse Nine (2026). He has received two Academy Award for Best Supporting Actor nominations for playing a war veteran in Places in the Heart (1984) and an assassin in In the Line of Fire (1993). Other films include The Killing Fields (1984), Empire of the Sun (1987), Dangerous Liaisons (1988), Of Mice and Men (1992), Con Air (1997), Rounders (1998), Being John Malkovich (1999), Shadow of the Vampire (2000), Ripley's Game (2002), Johnny English (2003), Burn After Reading (2008), Red (2010), and Bird Box (2018). He also had a recurring collaboration with art film directors Manoel de Oliveira and Raúl Ruiz. He has produced films such as Ghost World (2001), Juno (2007), and The Perks of Being a Wallflower (2012).

On television, he was also Emmy-nominated for portraying Herman J. Mankiewicz in the HBO television film RKO 281 (1999) and Charles Talleyrand in the historical miniseries Napoléon (2002), and received an Actor Award nomination for his performance as Kurtz in the TNT television film Heart of Darkness (1994). He also portrayed the titular character in the HBO miniseries The New Pope (2020).

== Early life and education ==
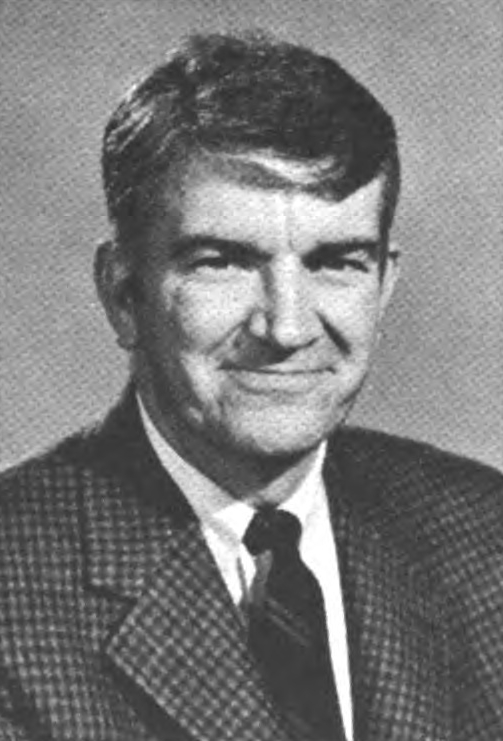
Malkovich's father, Daniel L. Malkovich, c. 1980

Malkovich was born in Christopher, Illinois, on December 9, 1953. He grew up in Benton, Illinois. His father, Daniel Leon Malkovich, was a state conservation director, who published the conservation magazine Outdoor Illinois. His mother, Joe Anne (née Choisser), owned the Benton Evening News daily newspaper and Outdoor Illinois. He grew up with an older brother and three younger sisters. His paternal grandparents were immigrants from Croatia, from the hamlet of Malkovići in the village of Lović Prekriški north of Ozalj. He has characterized his ancestry as half Croatian, 43% Romanian, and a broad mix of English, Scottish, French, and German. Through jus sanguinis, Malkovich was granted Croatian citizenship in 2026. Malkovich attended Logan Grade School, Webster Junior High School, and Benton Consolidated High School. While growing up in Benton, Malkovich's next door neighbor was Doug Collins, who became an NBA basketball player and head coach.

After graduating from high school in 1972, Malkovich enrolled at Eastern Illinois University. He then transferred to Illinois State University, where he majored in theater, but dropped out. He studied acting at the William Esper Studio.

== Career ==
=== 1976–1989: Broadway debut and film breakthrough ===
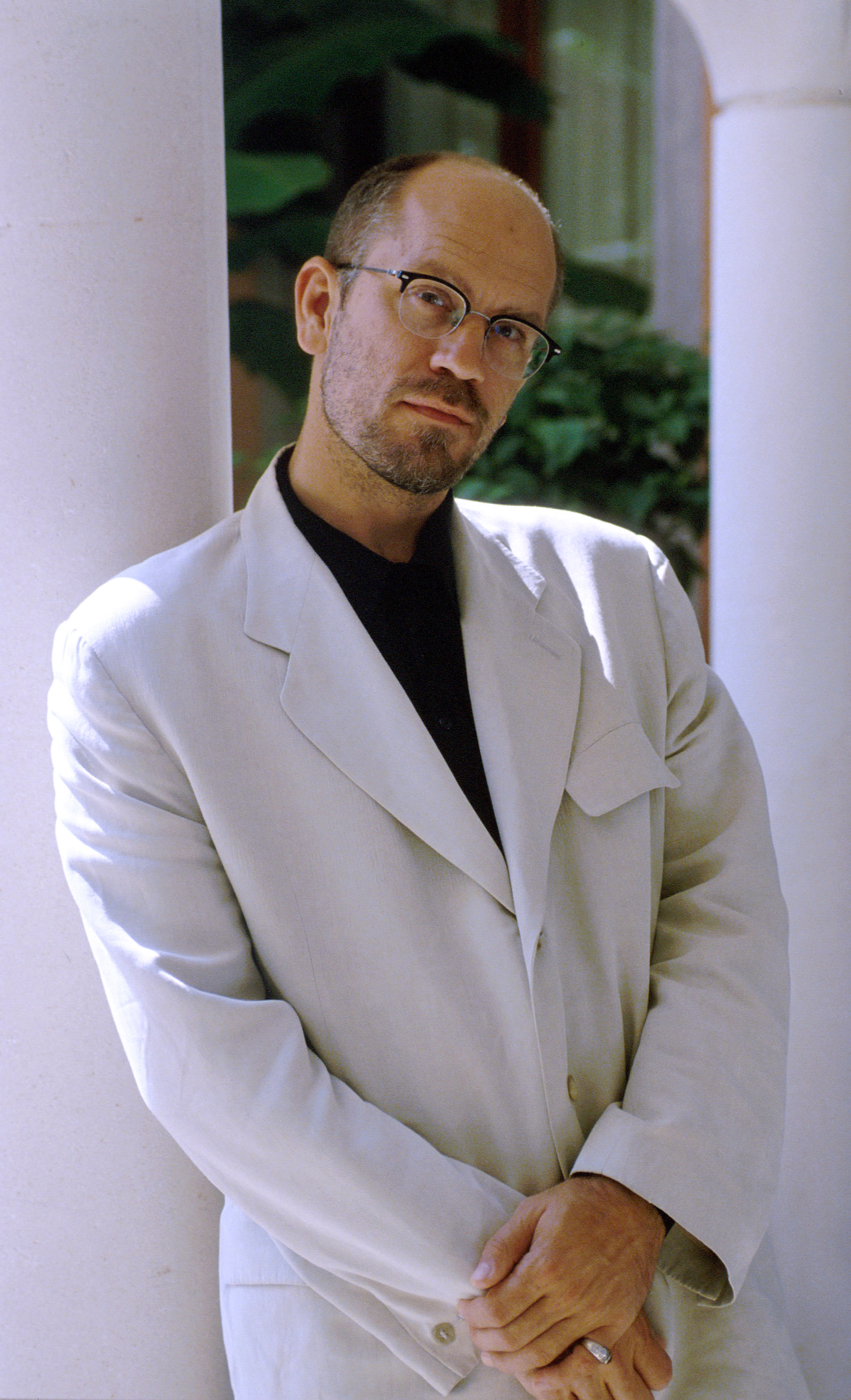
Malkovich in 1994

In 1976, Malkovich, along with Joan Allen, Gary Sinise, and Glenne Headly, became a charter member of the Steppenwolf Theatre Company in Chicago. He moved to New York City in 1982 to appear in a Steppenwolf production of the Sam Shepard play True West directed by Sinise, for which he won an Obie Award. One of his first film roles was as an extra alongside Allen, Terry Kinney, George Wendt, and Laurie Metcalf in Robert Altman's film A Wedding (1978). In early 1982, he appeared in A Streetcar Named Desire with Chicago's Wisdom Bridge Theatre. Malkovich then directed a Steppenwolf co-production, the 1984 revival of Lanford Wilson's Balm in Gilead, for which he received a second Obie Award and a Drama Desk Award. Other Steppenwolf productions in which Malkovich has appeared include: The Glass Menagerie by Tennessee Williams, directed by H. E. Baccus (1979); Burn This by Lanford Wilson, directed by Marshall W. Mason (1987); and The Libertine by Stephen Jeffreys, directed by Terry Johnson (1996). He made his feature-film debut as Sally Field's blind boarder Mr. Will in Places in the Heart (1984). For his portrayal of Mr. Will, Malkovich received his first Academy Award nomination for Best Supporting Actor. He also portrayed Al Rockoff in Roland Joffe's epic film The Killing Fields (1984).

His Broadway debut that year was as Biff in Death of a Salesman alongside Dustin Hoffman as Willy. Malkovich won an Emmy Award for this role when the play was adapted for television by CBS in 1985. He continued to have steady work in films. In 1987, he starred in Steven Spielberg's war drama Empire of the Sun as Basie, a captured American sailor. He next appeared as Tom Wingfield in the film adaptation of Tennessee Williams' The Glass Menagerie, directed by Paul Newman (who appeared in the film), Joanne Woodward, and Karen Allen. The third and final project of 1987 was Susan Seidelman's science fiction romantic comedy Making Mr. Right. Malkovich gained significant critical and popular acclaim when he portrayed the sinister and sensual Valmont in the film Dangerous Liaisons (1988), a film adaptation of the stage play Les Liaisons Dangereuses by Christopher Hampton, who had adapted it from the 1782 novel of the same title by Pierre Choderlos de Laclos. He later reprised this role for the music video of "Walking on Broken Glass" by Annie Lennox.

=== 1990–1999: Established star ===
He played Port Moresby in The Sheltering Sky (1990), directed by Bernardo Bertolucci and appeared in Shadows and Fog (1991), directed by Woody Allen. In 1990, he recited, in Croatian, verses of the Croatian national anthem Lijepa naša domovino (Our Beautiful Homeland) in Nenad Bach's song "Can We Go Higher?"

Malkovich starred in the 1992 film adaptation of John Steinbeck's novella Of Mice and Men as Lennie alongside Gary Sinise as George. He received his second Academy Award nomination for the Wolfgang Petersen-directed political action thriller In the Line of Fire (1993), playing a disillusioned former CIA agent who plans to assassinate the President of the United States. He was the narrator for the film Alive (1993) and starred in The Man in the Iron Mask (1998). Malkovich has hosted three episodes of the NBC sketch show Saturday Night Live. The first occasion was in January 1989 with musical guest Anita Baker, the second in October 1993 with musical guest Billy Joel (and special appearance by former cast member Jan Hooks), and the third in December 2008 with musical guest T.I. with Swizz Beatz (and special appearances by Justin Timberlake, Molly Sims and Jamie-Lynn Sigler).

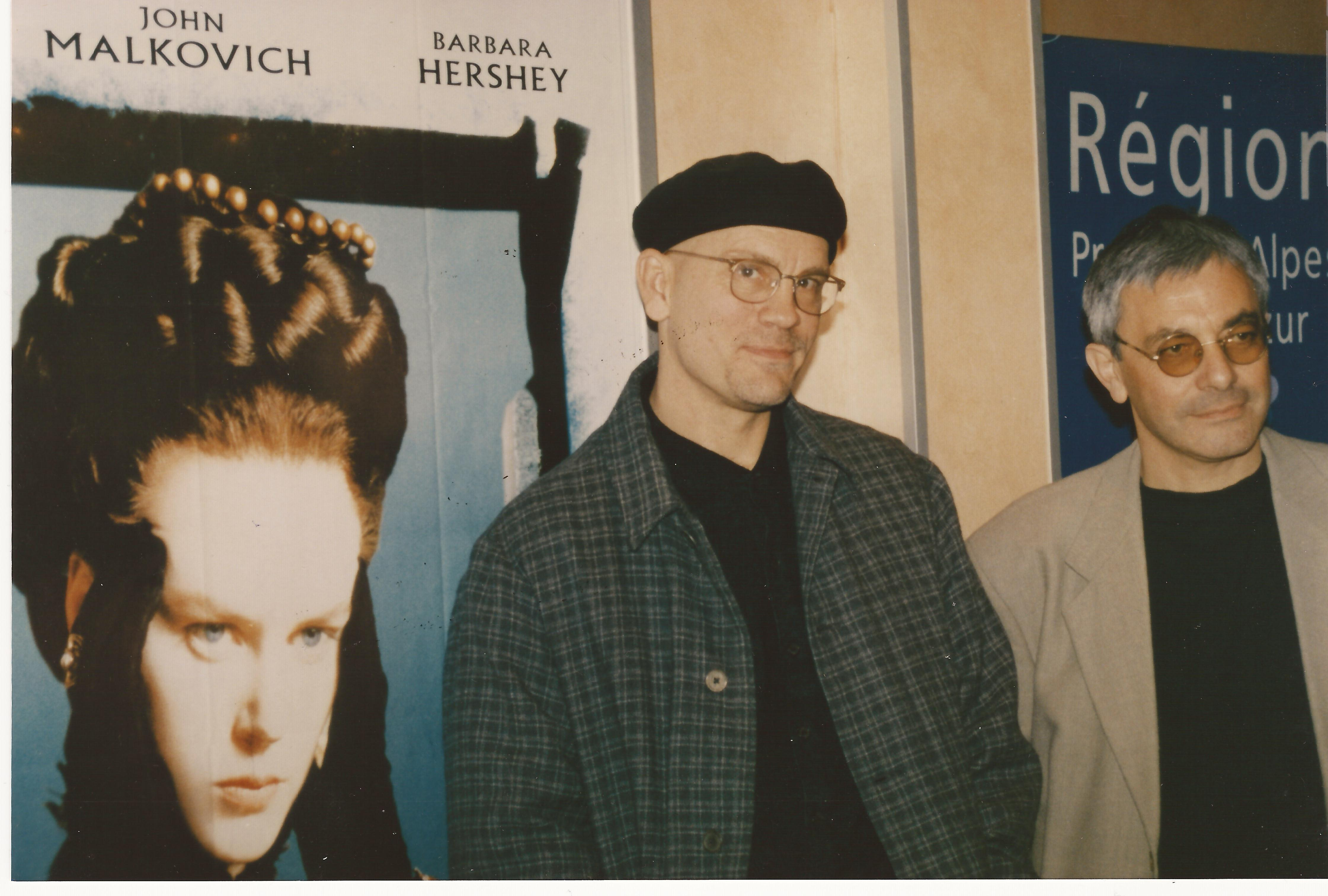
Malkovich at The Portrait of a Lady (1996) premiere

Malkovich was directed for the second time (after Dangerous Liaisons) by Stephen Frears in Mary Reilly (1996), a new adaptation of the Dr. Jekyll and Mr. Hyde tale, co-starring Julia Roberts. Malkovich also appeared in The Messenger: The Story of Joan of Arc (1999), directed by Luc Besson, playing the French king-to-be Charles VII. Though he played the title role in the Charlie Kaufman-penned Being John Malkovich (1999), he played a slight variation of himself, as indicated by the character's middle name of "Horatio".

=== 2000–2009 ===
In 2000, Malkovich was approached to play Green Goblin in Spider-Man (2002), but he passed due to scheduling conflicts and Willem Dafoe was cast in the role. In 2001, film director Michael Cimino had also approached Malkovich to star in his never filmed 3-hour long epic of André Malraux's Man's Fate, alongside Johnny Depp, Uma Thurman, Daniel Day-Lewis and Alain Delon. Malkovich's directorial film debut, The Dancer Upstairs, was released in 2002. That same year Malkovich made a cameo appearance in Adaptation. He played Patricia Highsmith's antihero Tom Ripley in Ripley's Game (also 2002), the second film adaptation of Highsmith's 1974 novel, the first being Wim Wenders' 1977 film The American Friend. Malkovich diversified his portfolio through the decade. These roles include the villainous Humma Kavula in the hit sci-fi comedy The Hitchhiker's Guide to the Galaxy (2005), the tyrannical King Galbatorix in the action fantasy film Eragon (2006), the wise royal servant Unferth in Beowulf, the English conman Alan Conway, who was known for impersonating film director Stanley Kubrick in Colour Me Kubrick (both 2007), Reverend Gustav Briegleb in Clint Eastwood's mystery crime Changeling (2008), a retired CIA agent in the action comedy Red, the Canadian jockey and horse trainer Lucien Laurin in Secretariat (both 2010), tech CEO Bruce Brazos in Transformers: Dark of the Moon (2011), and reprised his role as Marvin Boggs in Red 2 (2013). Dark of the Moon grossed over $1 billion, becoming his highest-grossing film. In 2009, Malkovich was approached and then cast for the role of the Marvel Comics villain Vulture in the un-produced Spider-Man 4.

Malkovich played the title role in the film The Great Buck Howard (2008), a role inspired by mentalist the "Amazing Kreskin". Colin Hanks co-starred and his father, Tom Hanks, appeared as his on-screen father. In November 2009, Malkovich appeared in an advertisement for Nespresso with fellow actor George Clooney. He portrayed Quentin Turnbull in the film adaptation of Jonah Hex (2010). Malkovich in 2014 was the voice actor of the villainous Dave the Octopus in Penguins of Madagascar. In 2008, Malkovich directed in French a theater production of Good Canary written by Zach Helm, with Cristiana Realli and Vincent Elbaz in the leading roles, at the Théâtre Libre in Paris. Malkovich won the Molière Award for best director for it.

=== 2010–present ===
He wrote and acted in The Infernal Comedy – Confessions of a Serial Killer, directed by Michael Sturminger, that toured many countries and venues between 2010 and 2013, including at the Deutsches Schauspielhaus in Hamburg, Germany, in May 2010. This was an operatic production, about the life of the Austrian serial killer Jack Unterweger. In 2011, he directed Julian Sands in A Celebration of Harold Pinter in the Pleasance Courtyard, Edinburgh, for the Edinburgh Festival Fringe. In 2012, he directed a production of a newly adapted French-language version of Les Liaisons Dangereuses for the Théâtre de l'Atelier in Paris. The production had a limited engagement in July 2013 at the Lincoln Center for the Performing Arts in New York City.

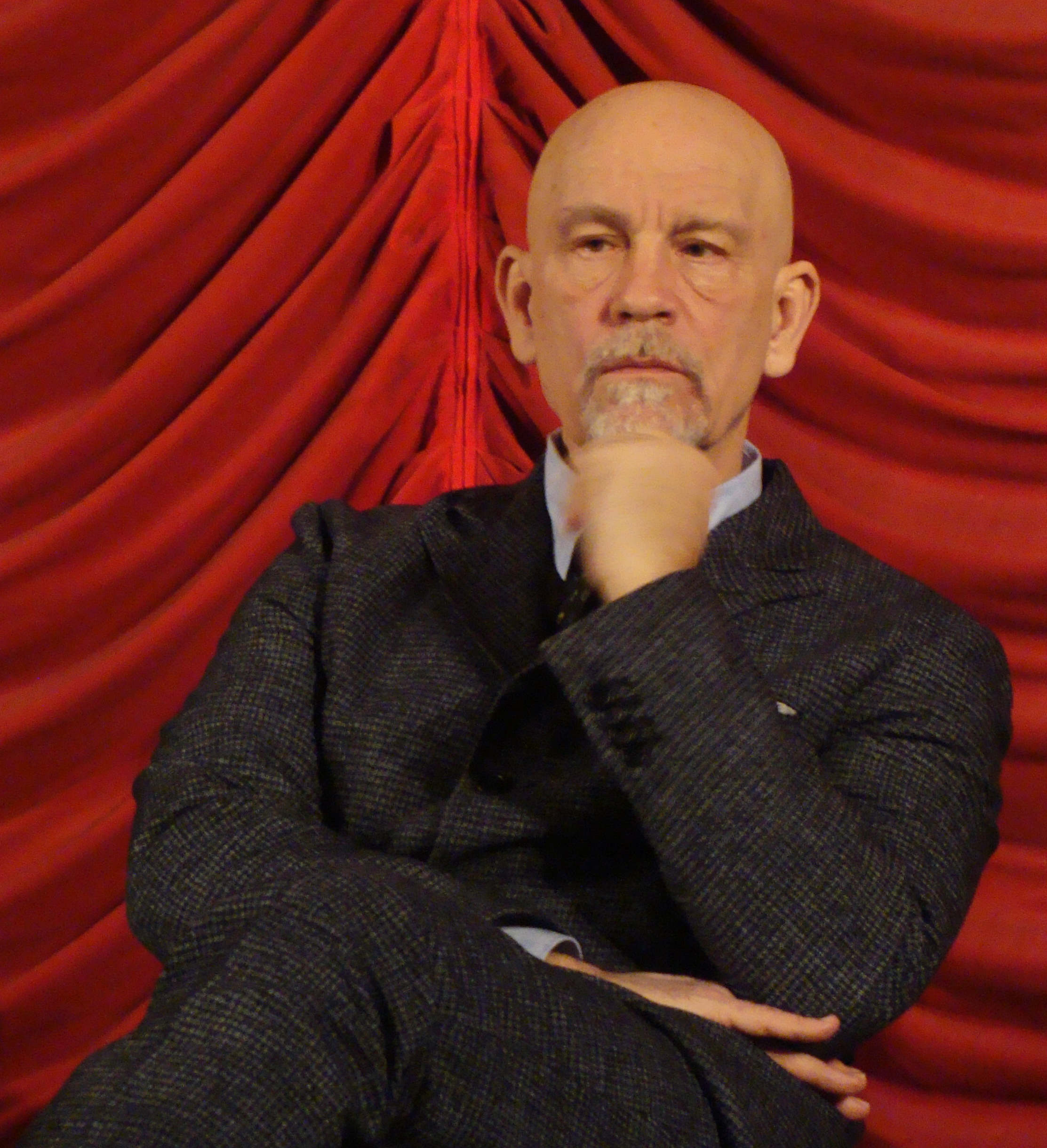
Malkovich in 2015

He returned to theatre, directing Good Canary in Spanish in Mexico, then in English at the Rose Theater in London in 2016. Ilan Goodman, Harry Lloyd, and Freya Mavor were in the cast. Malkovich won the Milton Schulman Award for Best Director at the 2016 Standard Theatre Awards. He appeared in Just Call Me God in Hamburg in March 2017. Malkovich wrote and starred in a movie called 100 Years (2016), directed by Robert Rodriguez. The movie is locked in a vault in southern France, not to be seen until 2115.

In 2018, Malkovich appeared in a three-part adaptation of Agatha Christie's The A.B.C. Murders co-starring Rupert Grint for BBC television, playing the role of fictional Belgian detective Hercule Poirot. In 2019, Malkovich performed in London's West End at the Garrick Theatre, starring in David Mamet's new play Bitter Wheat. He also starred as the title character in the HBO drama series The New Pope (2020). On September 26, 2019, it was announced that Malkovich had been cast as Dr. Adrian Mallory in the Netflix comedy series Space Force. The show ran from May 29, 2020 to February 18, 2022 and was cancelled after two seasons.

Malkovich's production of George Bernard Shaw's Arms and the Man, set during the Serbo-Bulgarian War, attracted protests from Bulgarian nationalists at its November 2024 premiere at the Ivan Vazov National Theater in Sofia. The protestors, who included members of the Union of Bulgarian Writers and right-wing political parties and movements, crowded the entrance, waving Bulgarian flags and held a banner which said "Malkovich, go home". Malkovich characterized the protests as not "a very smart idea" and rebuffed the suggestion that he had come to work in Bulgaria in order to denigrate the country's reputation.

He then starred as twisted pop star Alfred Moretti in A24's thriller Opus and In the Hand of Dante, which premiered out of competition at the 82nd Venice International Film Festival and is expected to be released in 2026 by Netflix. He will next star alongside Sam Rockwell and Steve Buscemi in Martin McDonagh's black comedy Wild Horse Nine, play conductor/ composer Sergiu Celibidache in the biographical drama The Yellow Tie, and the musical drama live-action animated A Winter's Journey.

Malkovich had scheduled a trip to Israel with his musical theater production The Music Critic on April 13, 2027, but cancelled it after a quote which was misattributed to him was included in a press release sent by the show’s Israeli public relations team to Israeli media outlets. The fabricated quote described Malkovich's purported "strong closeness and solidarity" with the people of Israel.

== Fashion design ==
Malkovich created his own fashion company, Mrs. Mudd, in 2002. The company released its John Malkovich menswear collection, "Uncle Kimono", in 2003, which was subsequently covered in the international press, and its second clothing line, "Technobohemian", in 2011. Malkovich designed the outfits himself. In an interview with Big Issue in 2024, Malkovich said that he "stopped doing fashion about six, seven years ago" but still enjoys seeing collections by "the great fabric designers".

== Frequent collaborators ==
He was also known for collaborating with art film directors Manoel de Oliveira and Raúl Ruiz. Malkovich was directed many times by Chilean director Raúl Ruiz — Le Temps retrouvé (Time Regained, 1999), Les Ames Fortes (Savage Souls, 2001), Klimt (2006) and Lines of Wellington (2012).

In 2008, directed by Austrian director Michael Sturminger, he portrayed the story of Jack Unterweger in a performance for one actor, two sopranos, and period orchestra entitled Seduction and Despair, which premiered at Barnum Hall in Santa Monica, California. A fully staged version of the production, entitled The Infernal Comedy premiered in Vienna in July 2009. The show has since been performed in 2009 through 2012 throughout Europe, North America and South America.

Malkovich was also directed by Sturminger in Casanova's Variations and its movie adaptation in 2014 (co-starring Fanny Ardant). For their third collaboration, in 2017, Michael Stürminger directed Malkovich in Just Call me God – the final speech, in which he played a Third World dictator called Satur Dinam Cha, who is about to be overthrown.

Malkovich frequently worked with Julian Sands. He has collaborated with the Lithuanian actress Ingeborga Dapkūnaitė on many productions; he has called her his "oldest, closest, colleague". In 1992 they appeared in the Steppenwolf production of A Slip of the Tongue, which later played in Shaftesbury Avenue in London, directed by Simon Stokes. She also appeared in Libra, a play directed and adapted by Malkovich about Lee Harvey Oswald, and, in January 2011, she appeared with him in The Giacomo Variations at the Sydney Opera House, as part of the Sydney Festival. In April 2023, Dapkūnaitė acted alongside Malkovich in In the Solitude of Cotton Fields in Tallinn, Estonia.

== In the media ==
In 2014, the photographer Sandro Miller recreated 35 iconic portraits of John Malkovich as the subject, in a project called Malkovich, Malkovich, Malkovich: Homage to Photographer Master.

Malkovich starred in his first video-game role in Call of Duty: Advanced Warfare in the "Exo Zombies" mode. In 1992, he appeared in period costume along with Hugh Laurie in the music video for "Walking on Broken Glass" by Annie Lennox. In 2015, he appeared in the music video for Eminem's single "Phenomenal". In 2017, he appeared in some humorous Super Bowl commercials portraying himself attempting to gain control of the johnmalkovich.com domain.

In 2026, Malkovich appeared in the Croatian National Tourist Board's promotional short film I Hear It's Beautiful. The premiere was attended by the Croatian Minister of Tourism and Sports Tonči Glavina and the Croatia national soccer team.

== Personal life ==
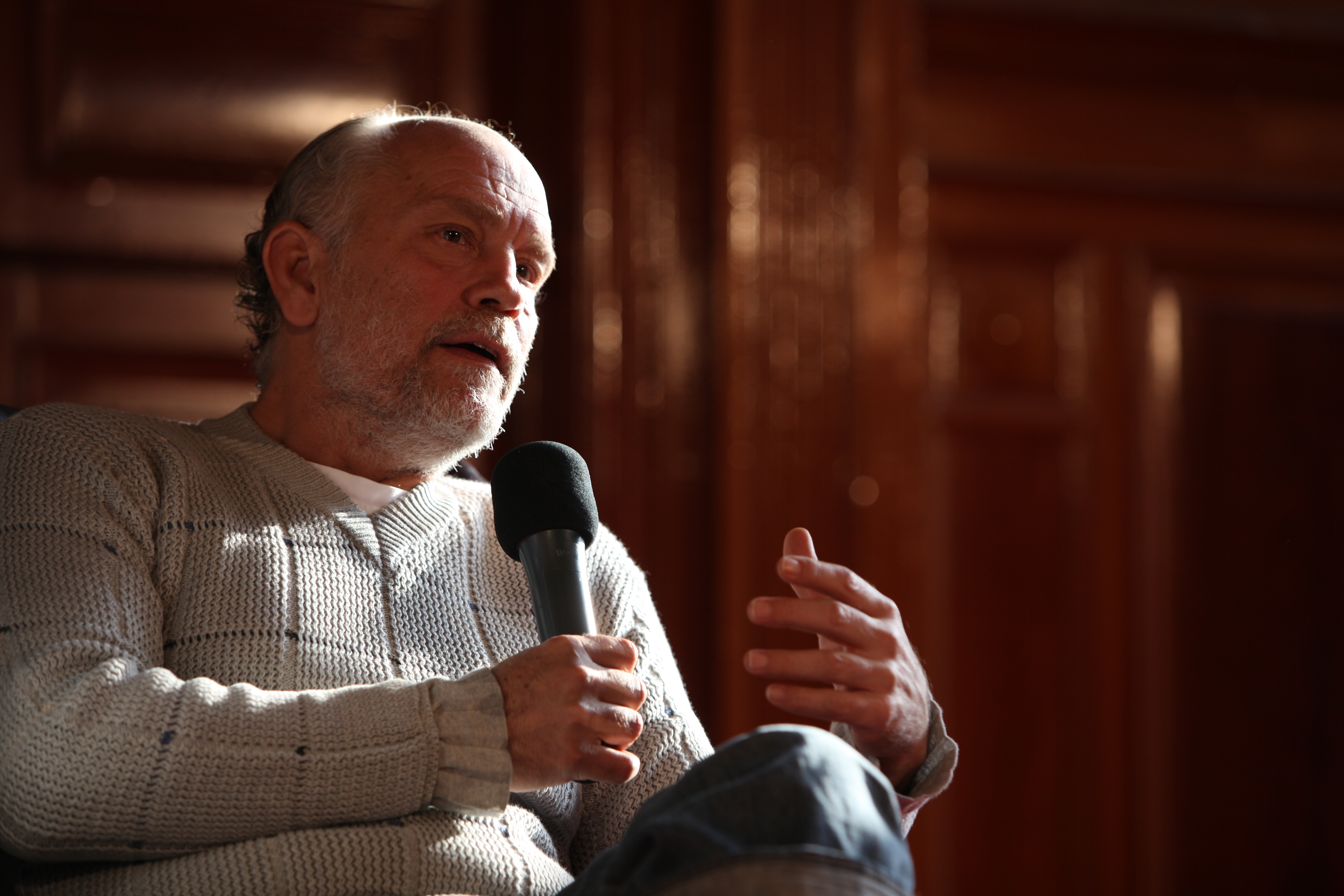
Malkovich in 2009

Malkovich married actress Glenne Headly in 1982. In 1988, they divorced following his affair with Michelle Pfeiffer. He began dating Nicoletta Peyran in 1989 after meeting her on the set of The Sheltering Sky, on which she was the second assistant director. The couple have two children.

Malkovich has a distinctive voice quality, which The Guardian has described as "wafting, whispery, and reedy". He does not consider himself a method actor.

Malkovich is fluent in French, having lived and worked in theater in southern France for nearly 10 years. In the 1990s, Malkovich and Peyran bought a farm near Lacoste, Vaucluse, which they later turned into a wine label named Les Quelles de la Coste. The couple started planting grapevines there in 2008 and produced their first vintage in 2011.

Malkovich and his family left France in a dispute over taxes in 2003 and have lived in Cambridge, Massachusetts. He sold his Cambridge house in 2023.

Malkovich is the co-owner of the restaurant Bica do Sapato and Lux nightclub in Lisbon. He lost millions of dollars in the Madoff investment scandal in 2008. He has raised funds for the Steppenwolf Theatre Company, his sole charity.

Malkovich stated in a 2011 interview that he is not a "political person" and that he does not have "an ideology", revealing that he had not voted since George McGovern lost his presidential run in 1972. At the Cambridge Union Society in 2002, when asked whom he would most like to fight to the death, Malkovich replied that he would "rather just shoot" journalist Robert Fisk and politician George Galloway, stating that Galloway was not honest. Journalists speculated that the comment was related to criticism of Israel and the war in Iraq.

When asked in an interview with the Toronto Star in 2008 whether having spiritual beliefs was necessary to portray a spiritual character, he said, "No, I'd say not... I'm an atheist. I wouldn't say I'm without spiritual belief particularly, or rather, specifically. Maybe I'm agnostic, but I'm not quite sure there's some great creator somehow controlling everything and giving us free will. I don't know; it doesn't seem to make a lot of sense to me."

On June 6, 2013, Malkovich was walking in Toronto when a 77-year-old man named Jim Walpole tripped and accidentally cut his throat on a piece of scaffolding. Malkovich applied pressure to Walpole's neck to reduce bleeding before Walpole was rushed to a hospital, and later credited Malkovich with saving his life.

== Acting credits and accolades ==
Throughout his career, Malkovich has received various accolades including three Emmy Awards and the Venice International Film Festival's Volpi Cup for Best Actor as well as nominations for two Academy Awards, two Actor Awards, a BAFTA Award, three Golden Globe Awards and a Laurence Olivier Award.

== See also ==
- List of atheists in film, radio, television and theater
- List of Primetime Emmy Award winners
