= In the Presence of Mine Enemies (Playhouse 90) =

16th episode of the 4th season of Playhouse 90

- Playhouse 90 episode
- Robert Redford and Susan Kohner
- Episode no.: Season 4 Episode 16
- Directed by: Fielder Cook
- Written by: Rod Serling
- Original air date: May 18, 1960
- Running time: 88 minutes

Guest appearances
- Charles Laughton as Rabbi Adam Heller; Arthur Kennedy as Paul Heller; Susan Kohner as Rachel Heller; Oscar Homolka as Josef Chinik; Robert Redford as Sergeant Lott

Episode chronology
← Previous "The Shape of the River"	Next → —

"In the Presence of Mine Enemies" is an American television play broadcast on May 18, 1960. It is the sixteenth episode of the fourth season of the CBS television series Playhouse 90, the 133rd episode overall, and the final broadcast in the show's four-year run.

The play depicted the struggles of Jews living in the Warsaw Ghetto in the months before the Warsaw Ghetto Uprising. Rod Serling wrote the teleplay, and the cast included Charles Laughton, Arthur Kennedy, Susan Kohner, and Robert Redford.

== Plot ==
The play is set in the Warsaw Ghetto in the months before the Warsaw Ghetto Uprising. It opens with a Nazi calling out names of Jews to be deported and closeups of grim Jewish faces as a song of Jewish mourning plays in the background. A Nazi asks: "They call them in here to pick out the ones who are to die, and yet they sing. Jews. Who can explain Jews?".

Rabbi Adam Heller lives with his beautiful daughter Rachel. His son Paul returns home in the first act after escaping from a Nazi prison camp. The rabbi and his son are at odds: the rabbi believes faith will guide the Jews through the war, but Paul has seen the savagery of the Nazis and advocates resistance.

A Christian peddler, Josef Chinik, aids the Hellers with food and books. Another character, Israel, collects weapons for an army of resistance forming in the ghetto.

At the end of the first act, a German officer, Capt. Richter, and a younger German soldier, Sgt. Lott, arrive to investigate rumours that the building is being used by a resistance group. In the second act, Capt. Richter rapes Rachel. On learning of the rape, Rabbi Heller becomes disillusioned and says, "My life has been an endless prayer and prolonged supplication to a God without ears, to a God without eyes.". Paul takes a knife and leaves the apartment to kill Richter.

In the final half hour, the Nazis conduct a search for Richter’s killer. Chinik falsely confesses that he killed Richter in order to save his Jewish friends. Chinik is executed, and his death causes Rabbi Heller to break down.

Three months pass, and Rachel is pregnant. Paul and Israel talk of the uprising planned for that evening. Sgt. Lott returns to the Hellers' apartment, professes his love for Rachel, begs the rabbi for forgiveness, and offers to escape with her. The rabbi forgives Lott. Initially, Paul resists the idea of Rachel leaving with a Nazi but then relents, allowing them to leave.

The play closes as the uprising begins with gunfire heard outside the apartment. Paul and Rabbi Heller walk down the stairs to join the uprising, a rifle in Paul's hand and a book in the rabbi's hand.

== Cast ==
- Charles Laughton as Rabbi Adam Heller
- Arthur Kennedy as Paul Heller
- Susan Kohner as Rachel Heller
- Oscar Homolka as Josef Chinik
- George Macready as Capt. Richter
- Sam Jaffe as Emmanuel
- Robert Redford as Sergeant Lott
- Otto Waldis as Kohn
- Bernard Kates as Israel

== Production ==
Peter Kortner was the producer. Fielder Cook was the director, and Rod Serling wrote the teleplay.

=== Serling's script ===
Rod Serling originally submitted the story, then titled Epitaph for a Walled City, in April 1959. In the original story, Paul refused to consent to his sister leaving with Lott, and Rabbi Heller killed his son so that his daughter would have a chance to live. The script was approved by CBS, but was shelved when two of the sponsors objected to the "depressing" subject matter.

A writer's strike in January 1960 created a shortage of scripts, and Serling's Warsaw Ghetto story was scheduled for production.

The production was ultimately sponsored by Allstate Insurance, a consortium of natural gas companies, and Camel cigarettes. A commercial aired during the play extolling the benefits of "silent gas" has been criticized as "utterly inappropriate."

In one scene, Capt. Richter explains the purported virtue of anti-Semitism, telling Sgt. Lott "there is morality in hatred" as "nations can feed on it and be strengthened by it and in the process become unified." Jack Gould of The New York Times found the exchange to be "absolutely chilling."

The play's title is taken from Psalm 23:5: "Thou preparest a table before me in the presence of mine enemies: thou anointest my head with oil; my cup runneth over."

Serling's teleplay was remade in 1997 for Showtime, also under the name In the Presence of Mine Enemies.

== Reception ==
=== Reviews ===
Jack Gould of The New York Times called it "a drama of searing tragedy and nobility." He gave high praise to Serling's teleplay and its "moving affirmation of the dignity and indestructibility of the human being."

Fred Danzig of the UPI gave a mixed review. He wrote that "Serling's dialogue, as usual, was eloquent, sharp and rolled forth with great smoothness." However, he found the overall dramatic effect to be that of "a debating society atmosphere where raw, desperate human feelings were called for."

Cynthia Lowry of the Associated Press called it a well-acted, grim and impactful drama that "pulled no punches" and "carried its bitter lesson."

In The Boston Globe, Percy Shain gave it a mixed review. He called it "powerfully written" and "grim, strong fare -- a story of stature -- something TV usually tries to avoid." He also praised CBS for airing it and called it "a worthy requiem to a distinguished series." On the other hand, he concluded it was "not entirely successful" as a drama as it lacked "the full-blooded flow of action" and ended up as "primarily a study in words rather than in deeds." While he praised the performances of Kennedy and Kohner, Shain criticized the performances of Homolka, Jaffe, and Laughton. He found Laughton to be miscast and a "caricature of a man." Serling also reportedly "loathed" Laughton's performance.

Bill Fiset in the Oakland Tribune praised Laughton's performance as "superb" and wrote that "[t]elevision's most distinguished program" "went out in considerable style."

=== Criticism as anti-Semitism ===
The CBS switchboard was flooded with calls after the broadcast, some complaining of the show's purported anti-Semitic aspects, including Paul's derision of his father's religious devotion and the sympathetic portrayal of Sgt. Lott. The novelist Leon Uris sent a telegram to CBS president Frank Stanton declaring the play to be "the most disgusting presentation in the history of American television" and demanding that the negative be burned. Stanton replied to Uris with a defense of the production and an expression of "shock that an eminent author would demand action tantamount to book burning."

== Bibliography ==
- Parisi, Nicholas (2018). Rod Serling: His Life, Work, and Imagination. The University Press of Mississippi. ISBN 9781496817501.
