= In the Presence of Mine Enemies (film) =

- DVD cover
- Screenplay by: Rod Serling
- Directed by: Joan Micklin Silver
- Starring: Armin Mueller-Stahl; Charles Dance; Elina Löwensohn; Chad Lowe; Jason Schwartz
- Country of origin: United States
- Original language: English

Original release
- Network: Showtime
- Release: April 20, 1997

In the Presence of Mine Enemies is a 1997 Showtime TV movie about the Warsaw Ghetto Uprising in World War II.

The film is a remake of an original TV drama scripted by Rod Serling for Playhouse 90, titled In the Presence of Mine Enemies, starring Charles Laughton.

The plot centres on a rabbi (played in the 1997 version by Armin Mueller-Stahl), and his children (Elina Lowensohn and Don McKellar). The movie also features Charles Dance as a German officer, and introducing Jason Schwartz as Israel leader of the orphan rebellion.
