= A Winter's Journey =

- Directed by: Alex Helfrecht
- Based on: Winterreise by Franz Schubert
- Produced by: Jörg Tittel; Philip Munger; Sean Bobbitt; Hugh Welchman; Reinhard Brundig; Benoît Rolland; Raphaël Berdugo; Alexis Perrin; Richard Mansell
- Starring: John Malkovich; Jason Isaacs; Marcin Czarnik; Martina Gedeck; Ólafur Darri Ólafsson; Gabriella Moran
- Music by: Andrè Schuen; Daniel Heide
- Production companies: Oiffy; BreakThru Films; Pandora Film; Wrong Men North
- Distributed by: mk2 Films
- Countries: United Kingdom; Germany; France; Belgium; Poland
- Language: English

A Winter's Journey is an upcoming live-action animated musical drama film directed by Alex Helfrecht and starring John Malkovich, Jason Isaacs, Marcin Czarnik, Martina Gedeck and Ólafur Darri Ólafsson. It is an adaptation of Franz Schubert's Winterreise.

== Cast ==
- John Malkovich as Leiermann
- Jason Isaacs as Wolfgang
- Marcin Czarnik as The Poet
- Martina Gedeck as Maria
- Ólafur Darri Ólafsson as Jakob
- Gabriella Moran as Therese

== Production ==
In January 2022, Sony Pictures Classics acquired distribution rights to the film in North and Latin America, the Middle East, Scandinavia, Australia, New Zealand, Turkey, India, South Africa, Southeast Asia, Japan, Thailand and airlines worldwide.

As of September 2023, the film is in post-production.
