= Of Mice and Men (1992 film) =

1992 American movie by Gary Sinise

- Theatrical release poster
- Directed by: Gary Sinise
- Screenplay by: Horton Foote
- Based on: Of Mice and Men (1937 novella) by John Steinbeck
- Produced by: Gary Sinise; Russell Smith
- Starring: John Malkovich; Gary Sinise
- Cinematography: Kenneth MacMillan
- Edited by: Robert L. Sinise
- Music by: Mark Isham
- Production company: Mice Productions
- Distributed by: Metro-Goldwyn-Mayer
- Release date: October 2, 1992 (United States)
- Running time: 111 minutes
- Country: United States
- Language: English
- Box office: $5.5 million

Of Mice and Men is a 1992 American period drama film produced and directed by Gary Sinise, adapted by Horton Foote from John Steinbeck's 1937 novella of the same name. It stars John Malkovich as the intellectually disabled Lennie and Sinise as George, two farm workers who travel together and dream of one day owning their own land. Like the novella, it explores themes of discrimination, loneliness, and the American Dream, as well as the desire for a place to call home.

This is the second theatrical film adaptation of Steinbeck's novel, following the 1939 film. It premiered at the 1992 Cannes Film Festival, where it was nominated for the Palme d'Or. Of Mice and Men was released in the United States on October 2, 1992 by Metro-Goldwyn-Mayer, to positive reviews.

== Plot ==
The film opens with George Milton in a boxcar, reminiscing what led to his current situation.

During the Great Depression, quick-witted George Milton and physically strong but mentally disabled Lennie Small are fleeing their previous employment, where Lennie was accused of attempted rape after he held onto a woman’s dress, prompted by his love of stroking soft things. They manage to evade men sending dogs after Lennie. They take a greyhound bus in Salinas and travel south to work on Tyler Ranch near Soledad.

George agrees to tell Lennie again about their dream, describing how they will one day have their own piece of land where Lennie will tend their rabbits. At Tyler Ranch, when the Boss becomes suspicious of Lennie's mental condition, George lies to him saying Lennie is his cousin and was kicked in the head by a horse as a child. They befriend old one-handed ranch-hand Candy; but Curley, the Boss's son and an arrogant boxer, torments them. Curley's wife flirts with Lennie and George, and George strictly instructs Lennie to stay away from her.

George meets their colleagues, respected headman Slim, and Carlson, who suggests they shoot Candy's sick dog and give him one of Slim's puppies. After a hard day, George is proud of Lennie's work and gets him his puppy. Candy offers to pitch in with Lennie and George to buy their farm. Just as it seems their dream is moving closer, Curley accuses Slim of keeping his wife company. Curley attacks Lennie for laughing, goading him to fight back. Prompted by George, Lennie crushes Curley's hand. George fears for their jobs but Slim gives Curley an ultimatum: if Curley tries to get George and Lennie fired, Slim will humiliate Curley by telling everyone how Curley's hand really got crushed. Concerned for his reputation, Curley reluctantly agrees to say his hand got caught in a machine.

Lennie talks about being lonely, and Curley's wife attempts to engage him in conversation. Frustrated, she runs to the house in tears vowing to leave the ranch forever. In the barn that evening, Lennie has accidentally killed his puppy and is greatly upset. Curley's wife enters and admits her loneliness, confiding that her dreams of being a movie star were crushed. Learning of Lennie's love of petting soft things, she lets him stroke her hair. She soon complains that he is pulling too hard. Trying to keep her quiet, Lennie accidentally breaks her neck and kills her. He runs to hide in the brush as George told him to do if in trouble. Candy finds Curley's wife dead and informs George, who then pretends not to know until Candy informs everyone else. Curley leads a lynch mob but George secretly steals Carlson's gun and finds Lennie first. George realizes that escape is impossible this time, so he calms Lennie by retelling him their dream. As George gets to the part where Lennie tends the rabbits, he shoots Lennie in the back of the head, sparing him death at the hands of the mob.

The scene returns to George sitting in a boxcar, remembering the good times he had working with Lennie.

== Cast ==
- John Malkovich as Lennie Small
- Gary Sinise as George Milton
- Ray Walston as Candy
- Casey Siemaszko as Curley
- Sherilyn Fenn as Curley's wife
- Noble Willingham as the Boss
- John Terry as Slim
- Richard Riehle as Carlson
- Joe Morton as Crooks
- Mark Boone Junior as the Bus Driver
- Moira Harris as the Girl in the Red Dress
- Alexis Arquette as Whitt

== Production ==
=== Development ===
The first experience Sinise had with Steinbeck's work came when Sinise attended Highland Park High School. His drama class went to Guthrie Theater and observed three plays in two days, one being Of Mice and Men. After viewing the play, he "stood up and applauded" and "was trying to scream some sort of acknowledgement of my feelings ... but I was so choked up nothing came out except tears." He credits the play with "[introducing] me to literature". Sinise became acquainted with Steinback's widow Elaine after mounting a Tony-winning stage adaptation of The Grapes of Wrath, and got her blessing to make a film adaptation of Of Mice and Men.

Screenwriter Horton Foote had previously collaborated with Steinbeck on the 1949 film of The Red Pony.

=== Casting ===
Sinise and John Malkovich had both previously played George and Lennie in a 1980 Steppenwolf Theatre production of the stage version.

Bridget Fonda was originally cast as Curley's wife, but was replaced by Sherilyn Fenn before filming began.

=== Filming ===
Sinise originally planned to shoot the film in California's Salinas Valley, the so-called "Steinbeck Country" in which the author was raised, but found it was lacking the distinctive wheat fields needed for the film. Instead, most of the film was shot at a ranch in Santa Ynez Valley, where a full-scale wheat farm was constructed by the production. The art department consulted Depression-era photography by Dorothea Lange and Walker Evans to build period-appropriate farm buildings. Other scenes were shot in Acton, Los Angeles, and the Warner Bros. Studios Burbank.

The film's editor, Robert L. Sinise, was Gary Sinise's father.

== Changes from source material ==
While the film and book tell the same basic story, some creative liberties are taken within the film.

- In the book, Candy only has his left hand, while in the movie, he only has his right, due to the actor Ray Walston being right-handed.
- For the scene depicting Lennie accidentally killing the puppy, the book portrays Lennie feeling remorse for his actions. In the film, he also appears worried and confused.
- When George shoots Lennie, the film depicts George shooting Lennie with little to no hesitation, while in the book, George hesitates. George also uses a Colt revolver in the movie; in the book, he uses a Luger.
- In the book, when Lennie talks to Crooks in his room, Candy joins them and they talk about the ranch and Crooks offers to join until Curley's wife comes in. She threatens to have Crooks lynched when he tells her to leave. In the movie, Lennie talks to Crooks alone and there is no interaction between Crooks and Curley's wife.
- Curley's wife is depicted in the book as flirtatious and cruel; she is portrayed as less of a victim when she dies. In the film, she is characterized as more lonely and bored and therefore painted as more sympathetic. This reflects changes Steinbeck himself made to the character in the stage adaptation.

== Release ==
=== Premiere ===
On April 16, 1992, Gilles Jacob, director of the Cannes Film Festival, announced the 27 films competing in the "Official Competition" category, including Of Mice and Men. The film premiered the next month and was Sinise's second film to compete at Cannes, after the 1988 feature Miles from Home. After viewing Of Mice and Men, critic Don Marshall noted how the audience gave a standing ovation to its cast. Marshall said he was "surprised" that the film did not win an award, although Sinise was nominated for the Palme d'Or, given to the director of the best-featured film.

=== Home media ===
MGM released Of Mice and Men on VHS in 1993 and on Video CD in 1995. The film was later released as a DVD by MGM Home Entertainment on March 4, 2003. The DVD is featured in widescreen with English, French, and Spanish subtitles, and has the option of French dubbing. The film was then released on Blu-ray by Olive Films on January 19, 2016.

== Reception ==
=== Box office ===
The film made its American debut on October 2, 1992, and grossed $5,471,088 from a total of 398 theaters. The Los Angeles Daily News described the film's box office performance as poor.

The most sincere compliment I can pay them is to say that all of them – writer and actors – have taken every unnecessary gesture, every possible gratuitous note, out of these characters. The story is as pure and lean as the original fable which formed in Steinbeck's mind. And because they don't try to do anything fancy — don't try to make it anything other than exactly what it is — they have a quiet triumph.

— Roger Ebert on Of Mice and Men

=== Critical reception ===
Of Mice and Men received positive critical acclaim. On the review aggregator website Rotten Tomatoes, 97% of 30 critics' reviews are positive, with an average rating of 8.0/10. The website's consensus reads: "Of Mice and Men honors its classic source material with a well-acted adaptation that stays powerfully focused on the story's timeless themes." Metacritic, which uses a weighted average, assigned the film a score of 73 out of 100, based on 20 critics, indicating "generally favorable" reviews.

Critic Roger Ebert complimented the cast on their attention to detail. Writing for Variety, Todd McCarthy was impressed at the set design, and contrasted the film's "lovely, burnished hues" with the studio-produced 1939 film. He went on to say that the actors' performances were "sterling" and gave the supporting cast positive reception.

Vincent Canby of The New York Times also praised the physical production and supporting cast, but added that the film "is not very exciting", possibly because "looking back at Lennie and George with the perspective of time robs them of their urgency." The Austin Chronicle's Steve Davis called it "unassuming but well-made".
