= Heart of Darkness (Playhouse 90) =

- Playhouse 90 episode
- Episode no.: Season 3 Episode 7
- Directed by: Ronald Winston
- Written by: Stewart Stern
- Original air date: November 6, 1958
- Running time: 1:29:07

Guest appearances
- Roddy McDowall as Charles Marlow; Eartha Kitt as The Queen; Oscar Homolka as The Doctor

Episode chronology
← Previous "Word From a Sealed-Off Box"	Next → "Old Man"

"Heart of Darkness" was an American television play broadcast on November 6, 1958, as part of the CBS television series, Playhouse 90. It was the seventh episode of the third season of Playhouse 90. The play was adapted from Joseph Conrad's novella, Heart of Darkness.

== Plot ==
Charles Marlow travels from England to Africa to reunite with Mr. Kurtz, the man who raised him. The two are reunited, and Kurtz seeks to brand Marlow as one of his slaves. Kurtz later dies in Marlow's arms.

== Cast ==
Sterling Hayden hosted the broadcast, in which the following cast received screen credit for their performances.

- Roddy McDowall as Charles Marlow
- Eartha Kitt as The Queen
- Oscar Homolka as The Doctor
- Cathleen Nesbitt as The Crone
- Richard Haydn as The Accountant
- Inga Swenson as Maria
- Boris Karloff as Mr. Kurtz
- Willard Sage as The Chaplain
- Fintan Meyler as The Woman
- Rusty Lane as Griggs
- Tom Palmer as The District Officer
- Nora O'Mahoney as Abbey

== Production ==
The play was directed by Ronald Winston and produced by Fred Coe. The teleplay was written by Stewart Stern based on the story by Joseph Conrad. Robert Tyler Lee was the art director. Robert Drasnin, who is best known for his albums in the exotica genre, composed and directed the music.

== Reception ==
In The New York Times, John P. Shanley wrote that called it "among the more pretentious mistakes of the season." He added the actors "were involved in a numbing exercise in dramatic mumbo-jumbo that was without merit or reason."

UPI television critic William Ewald wrote that Stern had so padded and twisted Conrad's story that it might be called "Variations on a Theme by Joseph Conrad." His overall reaction was that "it was a little like watching the lecture of a talented lunatic through the bottom of two martini glasses." As for the acting, he wrote that McDowall's performance "packed fits and starts of excellence" while Kitt was, "to put it kindly, inadequate", and Karloff was just "there."

In the Oakland Tribune, Bill Fiset wrote that the teleplay "led viewers a little too far off into fantasyland."
