= Kurtz (Heart of Darkness) =

- First appearance: Heart of Darkness
- Created by: Joseph Conrad

In-universe information
- Gender: Male
- Occupation: Ivory trader

Kurtz is a fictional character in Joseph Conrad's 1899 novella Heart of Darkness. A European ivory trader in Central Africa and commander of a trading post, he monopolizes his position as a demigod among native Africans. Kurtz meets with the novella's protagonist, Charles Marlow, who returns him to the coast via steamboat. Kurtz, whose reputation precedes him, impresses Marlow strongly, and during the return journey, Marlow is witness to Kurtz's final moments.

== In the novella ==
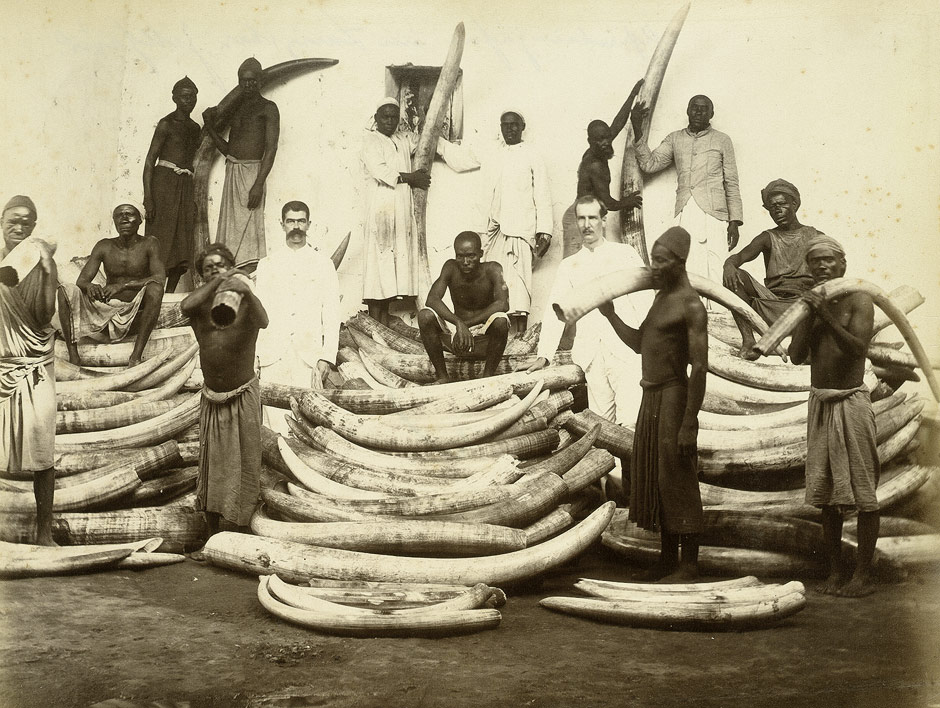
Ivory trade in East Africa around 1890.

Kurtz is an ivory trader, sent by a shadowy Belgian company into the heart of an unnamed place in Africa (generally regarded as the Congo Free State). With the help of his superior technology, Kurtz has turned himself into a charismatic demigod of all the tribes surrounding his station and gathered vast quantities of ivory in this way. As a result, his name is known throughout the region. Kurtz's general manager is envious of Kurtz and plots his downfall.

Kurtz's mother was half English, his father was half French and thus "All Europe contributed to the making of Kurtz." As the reader finds out at the end, Kurtz is a multitalented man—painter, musician, writer, promising politician. He starts out, years before the novel begins, as an imperialist in the best tradition of the "white man's burden". The reader is introduced to a painting of Kurtz's, depicting a blindfolded woman bearing a torch against a nearly black background, and clearly symbolic of his former views. Kurtz's painting suggests that he saw himself as a civilizing force, aiming to educate and enlighten the African continent, which was then often referred to as the "dark continent" due to its perceived unknownness and perceived backwardness by European colonizers. Kurtz is also the author of a pamphlet regarding the civilization of the natives. The presence of his admirer, the Russian "Harlequin", and what he reveals about Kurtz in his adulatory descriptions of him raises questions about Kurtz's actual beliefs and the sincerity of his progressive views.

However, over the course of his stay in Africa, Kurtz becomes corrupted. He takes his pamphlet and scribbles in, at the very end, the words "Exterminate all the brutes!" He induces the natives to worship him, setting up rituals and venerations worthy of a tyrant. By the time Marlow, the protagonist, sees Kurtz, he is ill with jungle fever and almost dead. Marlow seizes Kurtz and endeavours to take him back down the river in his steamboat. Kurtz dies on the boat with the last words, "The horror! The horror!" Kurtz ultimately was changed by the jungle. At first, he wanted to bring civilization to the natives, as his painting shows, but by the end it seems he wants to "exterminate" them.

== Basis ==
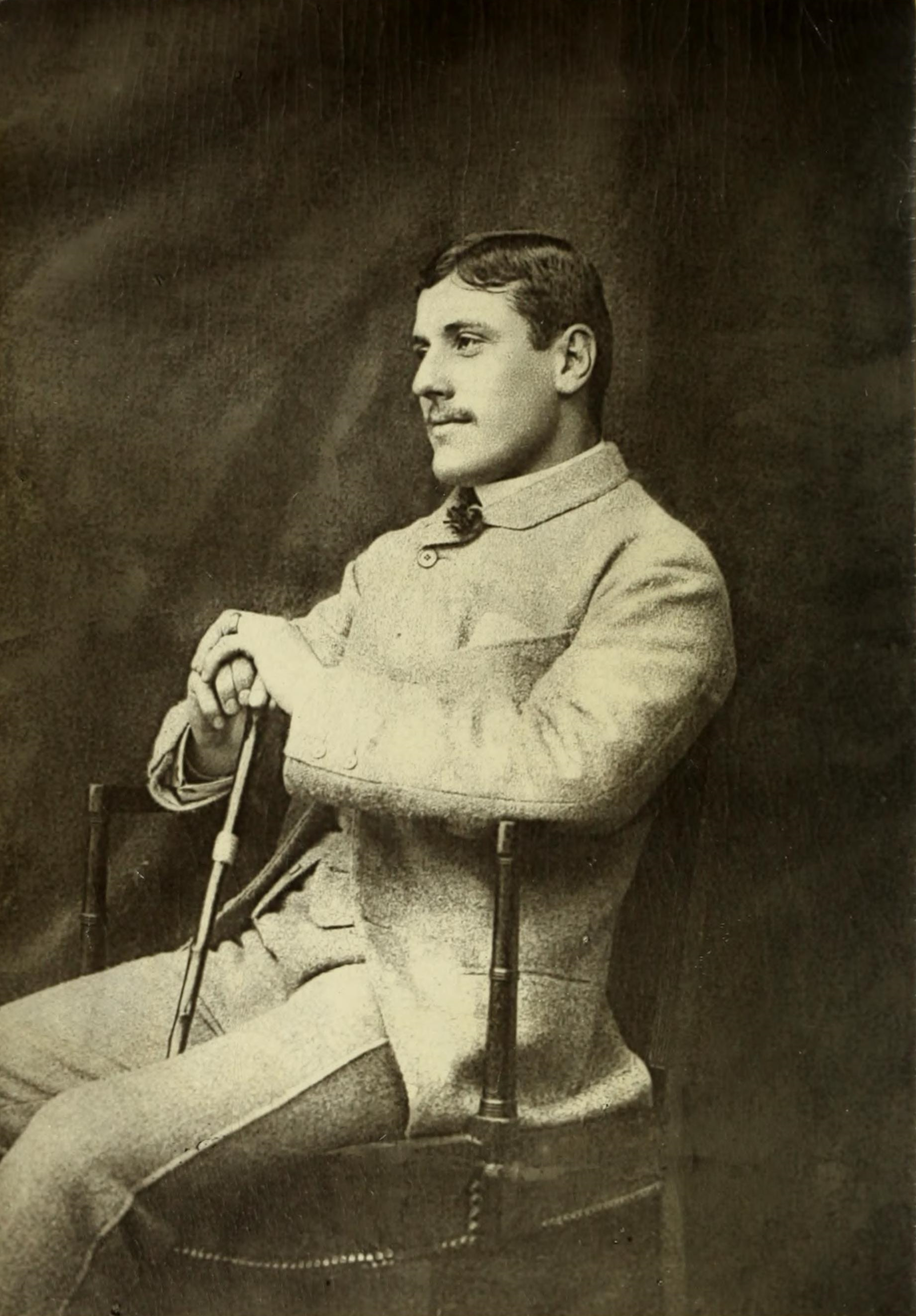
Edmund Musgrave Barttelot, who became notorious for his brutality, is one of the historical persons that may have inspired Kurtz's persona.

Kurtz's persona is generally understood to derive from the notoriously brutal history of the so-called Congo Free State, a territory that existed as the private property of King Leopold II from 1885 to 1908 until it was taken over by Belgium and became a Belgian colony. Researchers have suggested more than twenty prototypes for the character of Kurtz. In his book King Leopold's Ghost, historian Adam Hochschild suggests that Léon Rom, an administrator in the Congo Free State, was the principal inspiration for the Kurtz character, citing references as the heads on the stakes outside of the station and other similarities between the two.

Hochschild and other authors have also suggested that the fate of the disastrous "rear column" of the Emin Pasha Relief Expedition (1886–1888) on the Congo may have also been an influence. Column leader Edmund Musgrave Barttelot, "went mad, began hitting, whipping, and killing people, and was finally murdered". Harold Bloom notes that Kurtz's sophisticated brutality is closer to that of Barttelot's associate, slave trader Tippu Tip. The rear column's Scottish naturalist, James Sligo Jameson, who died in the Congo a few months after watching while a slave girl for whom he had paid was killed and eaten by cannibals, has also been suggested. The expedition's overall leader, Henry Morton Stanley, the principal figure involved in preparing the Congo for Leopold's rule, may also have been an influence.

Conrad's biographer Norman Sherry judged that Arthur Hodister (1847–1892), a Belgian solitary but successful trader, who spoke three Congolese languages and was venerated by Congolese to the point of deification, served as the main model, while later scholars have refuted this hypothesis. Peter Firchow mentions the possibility that Kurtz is a composite, modelled on various figures present in the Congo Free State at the time as well as on Conrad's imagining of what they might have had in common.

A personal acquaintance of Conrad's, Georges Antoine Klein, may also have been a real-life basis for the character. Klein was an employee of the Brussels-based trading company Société Anonyme Belge pour le Commerce du Haut-Congo, and died shortly after being picked up on the steamboat Conrad was piloting. Further, klein means "little" in German, and as Marlow muses in the novella, kurz means "short" in the same language.

Conrad also expressed admiration of Robert Louis Stevenson's Pacific Ocean writings, in particular, the stories "The Beach of Falesá" and The Ebb-Tide, as well as the non-fiction account of Tembinok' of the Gilbert Islands that appeared in In the South Seas. All three texts contain megalomaniacs who manipulate their circumstances and remote settings to assert power over others. It is widely believed that Conrad drew influence from these characters, as well as Stevenson's plot lines when writing Heart of Darkness.

== In other works ==
=== Film ===
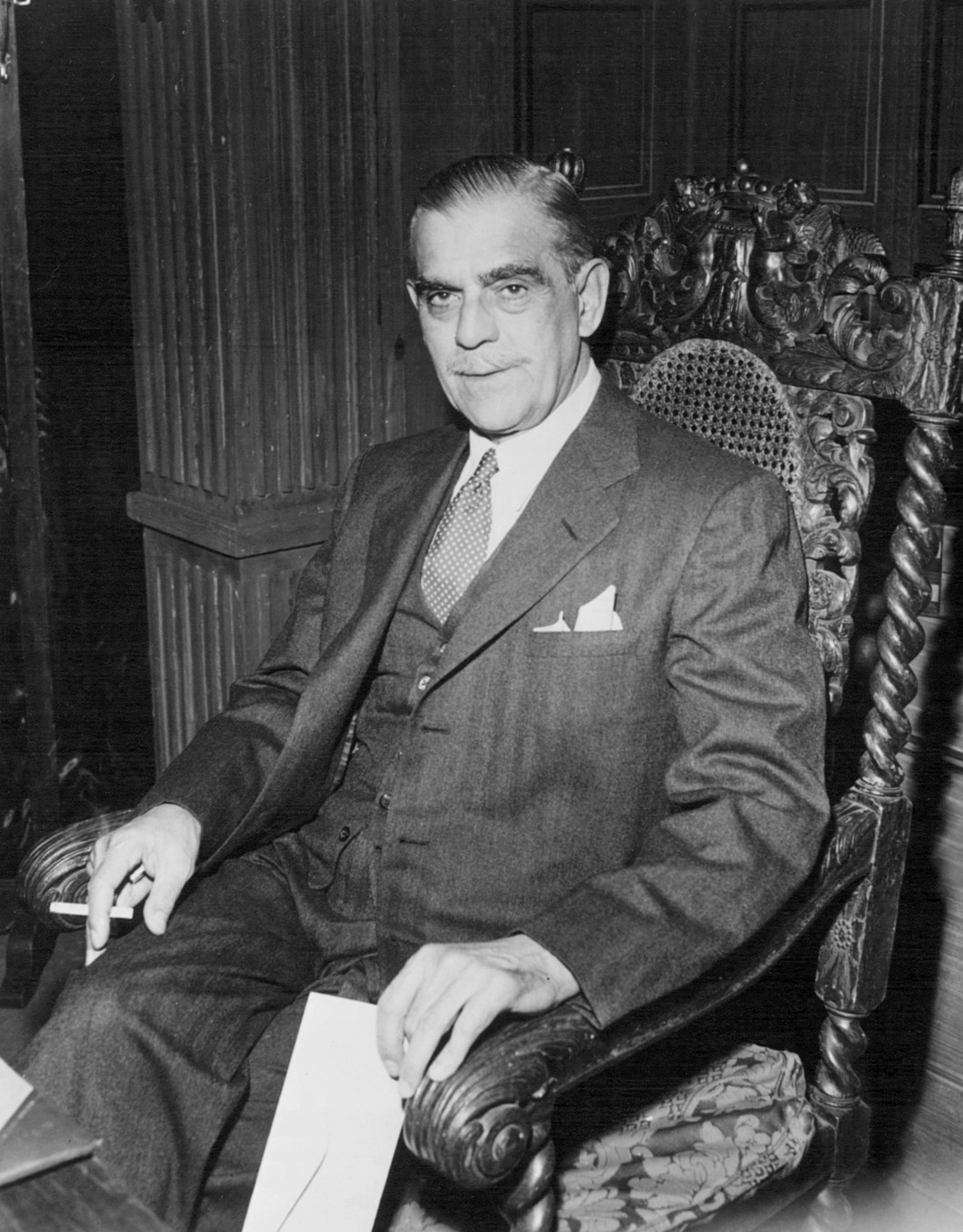
Boris Karloff (photo from 1957) played Kurtz in 1958.

In the 1958 loose adaptation for the CBS television anthology series Playhouse 90, Kurtz was played by Boris Karloff. This version uses the encounter between Marlow and Kurtz as its final act, and adds a backstory in which Marlow had been Kurtz's adopted son.

Francis Ford Coppola's acclaimed Vietnam War film Apocalypse Now (1979) centers on the protagonist's mission to find and kill the renegade Colonel Kurtz (played by Marlon Brando), based on Conrad's character, who has gone rogue far up a river, deep in the Cambodian jungle. The script acknowledges Heart of Darkness as a source of inspiration, and the last words of Colonel Kurtz, "The horror! The horror!", echo those of his namesake in the novel.

In the 1993 TNT version of the story directed by Nicolas Roeg, Kurtz, who has gone insane and is now doing the most horrible and blasphemous deeds, was portrayed by John Malkovich.

The 2020 documentary African Apocalypse follows the parallels between the fictional Kurtz and the brutal Paul Voulet, who led a murderous expedition into Niger in the year that Heart of Darkness was published.

=== Literature ===
Timothy Findley's novel Headhunter (1993) features Kurtz's escape from Heart of Darkness and subsequent reign of terror over the city of Toronto as the psychiatrist-in-chief at the Parkin Institute.

The poem "The Hollow Men" by T.S. Eliot starts off with the line "Mistah Kurtz – He Dead."

In Josef Škvorecký's novel The Engineer of Human Souls Kurtz is seen as the epitome of exterminatory colonialism.

=== Manga ===
Who Fighter with Heart of Darkness is an anthology that includes a manga adaptation of Heart of Darkness. Similarly to Apocalypse Now, the setting is changed to World War II–era Burma, where a soldier named Maruo is sent to hunt down the renegade Colonel Kurutsu.
