= Alan Conway =

English con artist (1934–1998)

- Born: Eddie Alan Jablowsky; July 10, 1934; Whitechapel, London, England
- Died: December 5, 1998 (aged 64); Harrow, London, England
- Other name: Alan Conn
- Occupations: Travel agent, conman
- Years active: 1980s–1990s
- Known for: Impersonating director Stanley Kubrick
- Status: Deceased
- Criminal charges: Theft, fraud, deception

Details
- Victims: Frank Rich; Joe Longthorne; Jim Davidson; Julie Walters; Patricia Hayes
- Locations: London, England

Alan Eddie Conway (10 July 1934 – 5 December 1998) was an English conman known for impersonating film director Stanley Kubrick. Conway and his wife were travel agents with offices in Harrow and Muswell Hill.

== Early years ==
Alan Conway was born Eddie Alan Jablowsky in Whitechapel, London on 10 July 1934. At age 13, he was sent to a borstal for theft. Around that time that he began changing his name and fabricating personal histories: among other stories, he told people he was a Polish Jew who had been imprisoned in a Nazi concentration camp.

During the 1980s, Conway left his wife for a male lover, who died of AIDS. Conway's business collapsed due to neglect, and he descended into alcoholism. He turned to crime to support himself.

== Kubrick impersonation ==
Conway's impersonations of director Stanley Kubrick occurred during the early 1990s, at which time Kubrick had been withdrawn from public view for about 15 years. Although Kubrick had worn a full beard since the 1960s, whereas Conway was always clean-shaven, the time gap meant that many accepted Conway's deception.

Conway convinced figures in the entertainment industry that he was the famed director, promising roles in films and exclusive interviews, and conned others into paying for meals and drinks, claiming his studio would reimburse them.

Frank Rich, a theatre critic for The New York Times, was taken in by Conway's act in Joe Allen's restaurant when he invited Conway and his friends to join him at his table. Rich later said that he believed Stanley Kubrick was homosexual after meeting Conway. Rich and his journalist friends were excited at the prospect of an exclusive interview with Kubrick, only discovering the truth after contacting executives at Kubrick's studio Warner Brothers, who were aware of the scam but had been unable to identify the imposter.

When Kubrick's lawyer informed Kubrick of the impostor, Kubrick was highly amused by the idea. Kubrick's wife, Christiane, was less impressed; she later reflected: "It was an absolute nightmare. This strange doppelgänger who was pretending to be Stanley. Can you imagine the horror?"

Conway was tracked down in part through the efforts of Kubrick's personal assistant, Anthony Frewin, who went on to write the screenplay for the film Colour Me Kubrick (2005), starring John Malkovich as Conway.

Conway was interviewed for the 1997 BBC TV series The Lying Game: The Great Pretenders, and was the subject of the 1999 Channel 4 documentary The Man Who Would Be Kubrick.

Conway died of a heart attack on 5 December 1998, three months before Kubrick's own death (also from a heart attack) in March 1999.

== See also ==
- David Hampton, a con-artist with a similar modus operandi
