= Joseph Conrad bibliography =

Author's works

The works of Joseph Conrad encompass novels, short stories, nonfiction, and memoirs. Although he was born in the Russian Empire and spoke Polish and French fluently from childhood, he wrote in English, which he did not learn until his twenties. Philosopher Wincenty Lutosławski recalled Conrad explaining this, saying "I value our beautiful Polish literature too much to bring into it my clumsy efforts. But for the English my gifts are sufficient and secure my daily bread."

== Novels ==
- Almayer's Folly 1895
- An Outcast of the Islands 1896
- The Nigger of the "Narcissus" 1897
- Lord Jim 1900
- Nostromo 1904
- The Secret Agent 1907
- Under Western Eyes 1911
- Chance 1913
- Victory 1915
- The Shadow-Line 1917
- The Arrow of Gold 1919
- The Rescue 1920 — begun in the 1890s
- The Rover 1923
- Suspense 1925 — unfinished, published posthumously

== Collections of novellas and short stories ==
- Tales of Unrest 1898 (TU)
- Youth: A Narrative and Two Other Stories 1902
  - Youth (serialized 1898)
  - Heart of Darkness (serialized 1899) — frequently reissued separately
  - The End of the Tether (serialized 1902)
- Typhoon and Other Stories 1903 (T)
- A Set of Six 1908 (S6)
- 'Twixt Land and Sea 1912 (TLS)
- Within the Tides 1915 (WT)
- Tales of Hearsay 1925 (TH)

== With Ford Madox Ford ==
- The Inheritors 1901
- Romance 1903
- The Nature of a Crime 1909

== Memoirs and essays ==
- The Mirror of the Sea 1906 (MS)
- A Personal Record 1912
- Notes on Life and Letters 1921 (NLL)
- Last Essays 1926 (LE)
- The Congo Diary and Other Uncollected Pieces 1978 (CDOUP)

== Stage and screen ==
- One Day More, play in one act (1905), adapted from the short story "To-morrow"
- Victory, drama in three acts (1919), adapted from the novel by Basil Macdonald Hastings, with input from Conrad
- Gaspar the Strong Man, unproduced screenplay for a silent film (1920), adapted from the short story "Gaspar Ruiz"
- Laughing Anne, play in one act (1920), adapted from the short story "Because of the Dollars" — unstaged until 2000, although broadcast as a radio play in 1932
- The Secret Agent, drama in four acts (1922), adapted from the novel

== Chronological list of texts ==
- 1890 Congo Diary (LE and CDOUP)
- 1890 Up River Book (CDOUP)
- 1891? The Princess and the Page
- 1889–1894 Almayer's Folly
- 1894–95 An Outcast of the Islands
- 1895 Author's Note to Almayer's Folly
- 1895–96 The Sisters
- 1896 An Outpost of Progress (TU)
- 1896 The Idiots (TU)
- 1896 The Lagoon (TU)
- 1896 The Rescue: Part I
- 1896–97 The Nigger of the 'Narcissus'
- 1897 Karain: A Memory (TU)
- 1897 Preface to The Nigger of the 'Narcissus'
- 1897 The Return (TU)
- 1898 Alphonse Daudet (NLL)
- 1898 An Observer in Malaya (NLL)
- 1898 Tales of the Sea (NLL)
- 1898 Jim: A Sketch
- 1898 The Rescue: Part II and III
- 1898 Unpublished Letter to The Times about the SS Mohegan Disaster
- 1898 Youth
- 1898–99 Heart of Darkness
- 1898–1902 Romance (with Ford Madox Ford)
- 1899–1900 Lord Jim
- 1899–1900 The Inheritors (with Ford Madox Ford)
- 1900–01 Typhoon
- 1901 Amy Foster (T)
- 1901 "Falk" (T)
- 1901–02 To-morrow (T)
- 1902 The End of the Tether (Y)
- 1902–1904 Nostromo
- 1903 The Books of my Childhood
- 1904 A Glance at Two Books (LE)
- 1904 Anatole France I (NLL)
- 1904 Henry James (NLL)
- 1904 Letter to the Times about the North Sea Affair
- 1904 A Glance at Two Books (LE)
- 1904 Preface to Maupassant: Yvette (NLL)
- 1904–05 Autocracy and War (NLL)
- 1904–05 The Mirror of the Sea
- 1905 One Day More, dramatization of To-morrow
- 1905 An Anarchist (S6)
- 1905 Books (NLL)
- 1905 Henry James, an Appreciation (NLL)
- 1905 Gaspar Ruiz (S6)
- 1905–1912 Chance
- 1906 The Brute (S6)
- 1906 My Best Story and Why I Think So (CDOUP)
- 1906 The Informer (S6)
- 1906 The Nature of a Crime (with Ford Madox Ford, CDOUP)
- 1906 The Secret Agent
- 1906 John Galsworthy (LE)
- 1907 The Censor of Plays: An Appreciation (truncated in NLL)
- 1907–1910 Under Western Eyes
- 1908 Il Conde (S6)
- 1908 The Black Mate (TH)
- 1908 The Duel (S6)
- 1908–09 A Personal Record
- 1909 The Secret Sharer (TLS)
- 1909 The Silence of the Sea (CDOUP)
- 1910 A Happy Wanderer (NLL)
- 1910 The Life Beyond (NLL)
- 1910 The Ascending Effort (NLL)
- 1911 A Familiar Preface to A Personal Record
- 1911 A Smile of Fortune (TLS)
- 1911 Prince Roman (TH)
- 1911 The Partner (WT)
- 1912 A Friendly Place for Sailors (NLL)
- 1912 Freya of the Seven Isles (TLS)
- 1912 Some Reflections on the Loss of the Titanic (NLL)
- 1912 Certain Aspects of the Admirable Inquiry into the Loss of the Titanic (NLL)
- 1912 The Future of Constantinople (LE)
- 1912–1914 Victory
- 1913 The Inn of the Two Witches (WT)
- 1914 Because of the Dollars (WT)
- 1914 The Planter of Malata (WT)
- 1914 Protection of Ocean Liners (NLL)
- 1915 Author's Note to the first American Edition of A Set of Six (CDOUP)
- 1915 Note to the First Edition of Victory
- 1915 The Shadow-Line
- 1915 Poland Revisited (NLL)
- 1915–1919 The Rescue: Part IV-VI
- 1916 A Note on the Polish Question (NLL)
- 1917 Author's Note to Nostromo
- 1917 Author's Note to Youth
- 1917 The Tale (TH)
- 1917 The Warrior's Soul (TH)
- 1917 Author's Note to Lord Jim
- 1917 Flight (NLL)
- 1917 The Unlighted Coast (LE)
- 1917 Turgenev (NLL)
- 1917–18 The Arrow of Gold
- 1918 First News (NLL)
- 1918 "Well Done!" (NLL)
- 1918 Tradition (NLL)
- 1919 Confidence (NLL)
- 1919 The Crime of Partition (NLL)
- 1919 Stephen Crane: A Note without Dates (NLL)
- 1919 Author's Note to A Personal Record
- 1919 Author's Note to An Outcast of the Islands
- 1919 Author's Note to The Mirror of the Sea
- 1919 Author's Note to Typhoon and Other Stories
- 1919 Memorandum on the Scheme for fitting-out a Sailing Ship (LE)
- 1919 The Lesson of the Collision. A monograph upon the loss of the "Empress of Ireland."
- 1919–20 The Secret Agent, a drama
- 1920 Author's Note to A Set of Six
- 1920 Author's Note to Chance
- 1920 Author's Note to The Rescue
- 1920 Author's Note to The Secret Agent
- 1920 Author's Note to The Shadow-Line
- 1920 Author's Note to Tales of Unrest
- 1920 Author's Note to 'Twixt Land and Sea
- 1920 Author's Note to Under Western Eyes
- 1920 Author's Note to Within the Tides
- 1920 Author's Notes to Notes on Life and Letters
- 1920 Author's Note to The Arrow of Gold
- 1920 Cablegram to the Committee for the Polish Government Loan, Washington (CDOUP)
- 1920 Laughing Anne, dramatisation of Because of the Dollars
- 1920–1924 Suspense
- 1921 Foreword to Corsican and Irish Landscapes (CDOUP)
- 1921 The Book of Job, translation of a novel by Bruno Winaver
- 1921 The First Thing I Remember (CDOUP)
- 1921 The Dover Patrol (LE)
- 1921 The Loss of the Dalgonar (LE)
- 1921–22 The Rover
- 1922 A Hugh Walpole Anthology Introductory Note (CDOUP)
- 1922 Foreword to J G Sutherland: At Sea with Joseph Conrad (CDOUP)
- 1922 Outside Literature (LE)
- 1922 Cookery (LE)
- 1923 Ocean Travel (LE)
- 1923 The Torrens: A Personal Tribute (LE)
- 1923 Christmas Day at Sea (LE)
- 1923 Travel (LE)
- 1923 Stephen Crane (LE)
- 1923 Draft of Speech to Be Made at the Lifeboat Institution (CDOUP)
- 1923 Foreword to A J Dawson: Britain's Life-boats (CDOUP)
- 1923 Proust as Creator (CDOUP)
- 1923 Speech at the Lifeboat Institution (CDOUP)
- 1924 Geography and Some Explorers (LE)
- 1924 Preface to The Nature of a Crime (CDOUP)
- 1924 Warrington Davies: Adventure in the Night (CDOUP)
- 1924 Preface to The Shorter Tales of Joseph Conrad (LE)
- 1924 Legends (LE)
- Dialogue to Victory, a drama
- Gaspar, the Strong man. Script for a silent film
- His War Book: A Preface to Stephen Crane's The Red Badge of Courage (LE)
