= Typhoon and Other Stories =

Collection of fiction by Joseph Conrad

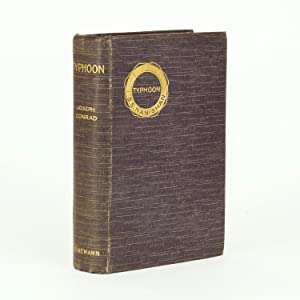
- First edition cover
- Author: Joseph Conrad
- Language: English
- Genre: Short story collection
- Publisher: William Heinemann
- Publication date: 1903
- Publication place: United States
- Media type: Print (hardcover)
- Pages: 205
- OCLC: 1134459427

Typhoon and Other Stories is a collection of short fiction by Joseph Conrad published in 1903 by William Heinemann and Company.

== Stories ==
Three of the four works from the collection first appeared in literary journals. The magazine and date are listed below.
"Typhoon" (The Pall Mall Magazine, January–March 1902)
"Falk" (Never serialized)
"Amy Foster" (The Illustrated London News, December 1901)
"Tomorrow" (The Pall Mall Magazine, August 1902)

== Background ==
Conrad began writing the four short stories that would comprise Typhoon and Other Stories while he was attempting to complete the third and final story for the proposed collection Youth, A Narrative; and Two Other Stories (1902) for William Blackwood and Sons. Setting aside "The End of the Tether"- and after finishing his novel Lord Jim (1900) - Conrad penned in quick succession "Typhoon", "Falk", "Amy Foster" and "Tomorrow".

Written at the personal request of publisher William Heinemann, Conrad was nominally subject to an arrangement permitting Blackwood publishing in Maga a "first refusal" for all his new stories. This awkward situation induced Conrad to enlist the services of a literary agent, J. B. Pinker. Pinker procured a substantially higher fee for the serialization of "Typhoon" and "Amy Foster" from other journals than offered by Blackwood.

Literary critic Laurence Graver notes the impact of Conrad's disengagement from Blackwood and his reliance on Pinker:

...Conrad took less and less direct interest in the magazine [that published] his work. After he stopped writing for Blackwood's, his fiction generally appeared in magazines of high circulation and low quality. But although he boasted of his obedience to artistic rather than financial compulsions, Conrad never became wholly indifferent to the restrictive pressure of periodical publishing.

== Sources ==
- Baines, Jocelyn. 1960. Joseph Conrad: A Critical Biography, McGraw-Hill Book Company, New York. ISBN 978-0297167556
- Graver, Laurence. 1969. Conrad's Short Fiction. University of California Press, Berkeley, California. ISBN 0-520-00513-9
