= Au coeur des ténèbres =

2014 comic book by Stéphane Miquel and Loïc Godart

- Date: 12 March 2014
- Page count: 104 pages
- Publisher: Soleil

Creative team
- Writer: Stéphane Miquel, adapting Joseph Conrad
- Artist: Loïc Godart

Original publication
- Language: French
- ISBN: 9782302031036

Au coeur des ténèbres (lit. 'In the Heart of Darkness') is a French comic book written by Stéphane Miquel and illustrated by Loïc Godart. It is based on Joseph Conrad's novella Heart of Darkness and was published by Soleil on 12 March 2014.

== Plot ==
In the late 19th century, the young man Marlow is sent from Europe to colonial Congo to search for a man named Kurtz who mysteriously has disappeared.

== Reception ==
Benjamin Roure of BoDoï wrote that adapting Heart of Darkness is a dangerous task due to its intentionally obscured perspective and the protagonist's gradual discovery of absurdity. Roure wrote that Miquel and Godart succeed brilliantly at telling the story with a slow and hypnotic rhythm, which works in harmony with the "semi-realistic" drawing style, with reddish brown hues and imagery that never becomes boring.
