= The Nigger of the "Narcissus" =

1897 novella by Joseph Conrad

- First edition cover from the UK
- Author: Joseph Conrad
- Language: English
- Genre: Nautical fiction
- Set in: A ship on the Indian Ocean and Atlantic Ocean
- Publisher: Heinemann
- Publication date: December 1897
- Publication place: United Kingdom
- Media type: Print (hardback)
- Pages: 120
- OCLC: 843064325
- Dewey Decimal: 823.912
- LC Class: PR6005.O57
- Preceded by: An Outcast of the Islands
- Followed by: Heart of Darkness
- Text: The Nigger of the "Narcissus" at Wikisource

The first US edition was published by Dodd, Mead and Company, and actually preceded the English edition.

The Nigger of the "Narcissus": A Tale of the Forecastle (Note: The forecastle is the forward part of a ship with the sailors' living quarters, or the upper deck of a sailing ship forward of the foremast.) (sometimes subtitled A Tale of the Sea) is an 1897 novella by Polish-British novelist Joseph Conrad. The central character is an Afro-Caribbean man who is ill at sea while aboard the trading ship Narcissus heading towards London. It was renamed The Children of the Sea: A Tale of the Forecastle for the 1897 US edition. The novella dignifies the men in the forecastle and "explores voices at the margin of society".

Some critics have described the novella as marking the start of Conrad's major or middle period; others have placed it as the best work of his early period. In a letter, Conrad classifies the novella to be “the story by which, as creative artist, I stand or fall, and which, at any rate, no one else could have written. A landmark in literature, I can safely say, for nothing like it has been ever done before”.

== Preface ==
Conrad's preface to the novel, regarded as a manifesto of literary impressionism, is considered one of his most significant pieces of nonfiction writing. It begins with the line: "A work that aspires, however humbly, to the condition of art should carry its justification in every line".

== Plot ==
The title character, James Wait, is a dying West Indian black sailor on board the merchant ship Narcissus, on which he finds passage from Bombay to London. Suffering from tuberculosis, Wait becomes seriously ill almost from the outset, arousing the sympathies of many. The ship's white master, Captain Allistoun, and an old white sailor named Singleton remain concerned primarily with their duties and appear indifferent to Wait's condition. Rounding the Cape of Good Hope, the ship capsizes onto her beam-ends during a sudden gale and half her hull is submerged, with many of the crew's rations and personal belongings lost; the men cling onto the deck for an entire night and day, waiting in silence for the ship to turn over the rest of the way and sink. Allistoun refuses to allow the masts to be severed, which might allow the hull to right itself but would prevent the ship from making use of her sails. Five of the men, realising Wait is unaccounted for, climb down to his cabin and rescue him at their own peril. When the storm passes and the wind returns, Allistoun directs the weary men to catch the wind, which succeeds in righting the ship.

The voyage resumes but eventually drifts into the doldrums, where the headwinds diminish and the ship is becalmed for many days. Rations grow even scarcer and the men become anxious to return home. Wait eventually confesses to a lazy Cockney sailor named Donkin that he is not as sick as he first claimed: he is feigning illness to avoid having to participate in the laborious work required of every healthy seaman. Many others had already grown suspicious of him, and Captain Allistoun reveals Wait's charade before the entire crew. Wait claims he feels well enough now to work, but the captain orders that he be confined to the forecastle for the remainder of the voyage, a decision which quickly polarises much of the crew between Wait's supporters and detractors. Allistoun prevents a near-mutiny encouraged by the conniving Donkin. Forced to stay abed, Wait grows increasingly frail as his condition deteriorates. The ship continues to drift without a breeze and some of the crew, including Singleton, begin to whisper that Wait himself is responsible and that only his death will bring favourable winds.

As the ship passes the Azores and Wait nears death, Donkin discreetly plunders Wait's personal belongings from his sea chest. Wait eventually dies—the first proof that he was genuinely ill. This occurs within sight of land, as Singleton had predicted, and a strong wind returns immediately after Wait's body has been committed to the sea. The Narcissus soon arrives in England.

== History ==
The work, written in 1896 and partly based on Conrad's experiences of a voyage from Bombay to Dunkirk, began as a short story but developed into a novella of some 53,000 words. As it grew, Conrad began to think of its being serialised. After Smith Elder had rejected it for the Cornhill Magazine, William Ernest Henley accepted it for the New Review, and Conrad wrote to his agent, Edward Garnett, "Now I have conquered Henley, I ain't 'fraid o' the divvle himself!" Some years later, in 1904, Conrad described this acceptance as "the first event in my writing life which really counted".

In the United States, the novel was first published under the title The Children of the Sea: A Tale of the Forecastle. The original had also proven controversial in Britain, with one reviewer calling it "the ugliest conceivable title"; American reviewers were mixed, with one praising the new title for "superior refinement" and another arguing it "insulted the public by imputing prudery to the American reader."

== Analysis ==
The novel has been seen as an allegory about isolation and solidarity, with the ship's company serving as a microcosm of a social group. Conrad appears to suggest that humanitarian sympathies are, at their core, feelings of self-interest and that a heightened sensitivity to suffering can be detrimental to the management of human society.

In 2006, in his critical study of Conrad, John G. Peters said of the work:

The unfortunately titled The "Nigger" of the Narcissus (titled The Children of the Sea in the first American edition) is Conrad's best work of his early period. In fact, were it not for the book's title, it undoubtedly would be read more often than it is currently. At one time, it was one of Conrad's most frequently read books. In part because of its brevity, in part because of its adventure qualities, and in part because of its literary qualities, the novel used to attract a good deal of attention.

== See also ==
- Joseph Conrad's bibliography
- Nautical terms
