= Swept from the Sea =

- Theatrical release poster
- Directed by: Beeban Kidron
- Screenplay by: Tim Willocks
- Based on: "Amy Foster" by Joseph Conrad
- Produced by: Beeban Kidron; Charles Steel; Polly Tapson
- Starring: Vincent Perez; Rachel Weisz; Ian McKellen; Joss Ackland; Kathy Bates
- Cinematography: Dick Pope
- Edited by: Alex Mackie; Andrew Mondshein
- Music by: John Barry (Note: The song "To Love and Be Loved", performed by Corina Brouder, did not make it to the final cut as it was submitted too late. The song was only included on the original soundtrack album.)
- Production companies: TriStar Pictures; Phoenix Pictures; Tapson Steel Films
- Distributed by: Sony Pictures Releasing
- Release dates: September 9, 1997 (TFF); January 23, 1998 (United States)
- Running time: 115 minutes
- Countries: United Kingdom; United States
- Language: English
- Box office: $283,081

Swept from the Sea (known as Amy Foster in the UK) is a 1997 drama film directed by Beeban Kidron and starring Vincent Perez, Rachel Weisz, and Ian McKellen. Based on the 1901 short story "Amy Foster" by Joseph Conrad, (Note: This is the third filming of Joseph Conrad's short story "Amy Foster".) the film is about a doomed love affair between a simple country girl and a Ukrainian peasant who is swept onto the Cornish shore in 1888 after his emigrant ship sinks on its way to America.

== Plot ==
Yanko Góral, a Ukrainian peasant, is swept ashore on the coast of Cornwall, England, after his emigrant ship sinks on its way to the United States in 1888. The bodies of his fellow passengers wash ashore and are soon buried in a mass grave. Yanko makes his way to the Swaffer farm, where his dishevelled appearance frightens the family. Amy Foster, however, is not frightened by the stranger. Amy is a loner who visits her parents, Mary and Isaac Foster every Sunday, despite receiving very little love from them. Her father calls her a "queer sort" who collects things that wash ashore, and blames her for his scandalous marriage—Mary was already pregnant before they were married. Amy attends to Yanko—washing, feeding, and caring for him. The next morning, Yanko is taken away by the townspeople to work as slave labour.

A few months later, Dr. Kennedy and Mr. Swaffer are playing chess when Yanko approaches and shows the men a series of brilliant chess moves. Dr. Kennedy soon determines that the man is in fact Ukrainian. Having gained a newfound respect for the stranger, the Swaffers take him in, start paying him for his labor, and give him normal working hours. Yanko learns from the doctor that Miss Swaffer, on the eve of her wedding day, had a horse-riding accident and broke her spine. The doctor also reveals that he lost his wife and son to typhus "many lifetimes ago." The doctor's fatherly affection for Yanko is evident in their meetings, where Yanko learns English and the doctor learns chess. Yanko purchases a new suit of clothes with the wages he's saved up, which gives him the courage to visit Amy and ask her to walk out with him.

When Mr. Swaffer learns of Yanko's interest in Amy, he tries to dissuade her from any romantic involvement. Amy's parents also urge her to stay away—her mother warning her that love is "God's trick upon women." When Yanko goes to church, he encounters a hostility in the congregation that bewilders him. "Their eyes are like glass," he later tells Amy, who finds him at the obelisk memorial for the ship's dead. There he learns for the first time what happened to his fellow passengers. To escape the hate, Amy takes Yanko to her secret cave filled with treasures she found on the shore, which she calls "gifts from the sea." Yanko and Amy dance and embrace in the cave.

Soon after, while walking alone in town, Yanko is set upon by Amy's father and his thuggish friends, beaten up, and nearly drowned before being saved by Amy, who takes care of him in the coming days. Meanwhile, Dr. Kennedy has little sympathy for Amy, whom he considers "a little strange" and "slow of the mind". Kennedy chastises the father and his thuggish friends for their actions. Amy's father, however, retains his hatred for Amy whom Mary reveals to be in fact the child of his father, saying, "Not a tear. Bad you were conceived and bad you've remained." Mary had been employed by Isaac's father.

After someone sets fire to Amy's cave, Miss Swaffer arranges for the cottage to be given to Amy and Yanko, who are soon married in church. Afterwards, they make love in the cave pool, with Yanko saying, "We are the lucky ones." Later that year they have a son, who is delivered by the doctor. Amy asks Yanko to show the child the sea, and he does, while the doctor looks on approvingly. Amy's new-found happiness, however, is soon cut short by the town's children who taunt her and call her a witch. When Yanko learns of this, he is angry and shares his feelings with Dr. Kennedy, who tries to console him. Believing he cannot leave because Amy has found a home in Cornwall, Yanko's greater concern is for his child and his future. Yanko tells the doctor, "I want him to be like you ... I want him to have the learning of great men. I want him to love the mystery of our universe." The doctor pledges to help his son.

One day Yanko becomes sick with a fever. Dr. Kennedy arrives and treats him, gives Amy medicine to give to Yanko, and urges her to stay with him while the doctor continues his rounds. Unfortunately, Yanko's condition worsens and he becomes delirious—seeing a vision of his sinking ship. Unable to understand what he's saying, Amy doesn't know what to do, and when Yanko loses control and the medicine bottle smashes, Amy flees the cottage with the child in a rainstorm in search of help. Her first stop is at her parents' house, but her mother turns her away. On the road she stops a neighbor and pleads for help, but is also rejected. Finally, she makes it to the Swaffers' house, and Miss Swaffer agrees to watch the baby while Mr. Swaffer accompanies Amy back to her cottage. Meanwhile, Dr. Kennedy returns to the cottage and discovers Yanko lying on the floor near death. Shortly after, Amy arrives and takes her dying husband in her arms as he says, "I would change nothing, my love, my gold—we are the lucky ones."

Years later, Dr. Kennedy complains to Miss Swaffer about Amy not having shown appropriate grief for her deceased husband. He wonders how she could wipe Yanko's memory from her mind so easily, but Miss Swaffer points out that the doctor has wiped from his memory his own ghosts of his dead wife and son. Soon after, Dr. Kennedy visits Amy and apologizes for wronging her, asks to be forgiven, and the two embrace. Amy declares, "I will love him until the end of the world." Dr. Kennedy concludes his story to Miss Swaffer saying, "He came across the world to love and be loved by Amy Foster."

== Cast ==
- Rachel Weisz as Amy Foster
- Vincent Perez as Yanko Gooral
- Ian McKellen as Dr. James Kennedy
- Kathy Bates as Miss Swaffer
- Joss Ackland as Mr. Swaffer
- Tony Haygarth as Mr. Smith
- Fiona Victory as Mrs. Smith
- Tom Bell as Isaac Foster
- Zoë Wanamaker as Mary Foster
- Neil Rutherford as Brother Petr

== Production ==
It was produced by Tapson Steel Films and Phoenix Pictures, in association with Canal+. The production received further help from The Greenlight Fund, the Arts Council of England, and British Screen.

=== Filming locations ===
Swept from the Sea was filmed on location in Cornwall and West Yorkshire, England.

- Blisland, Cornwall, England, UK
- Bodmin, Cornwall, England, UK
- Cornwall, Cornwall, England, UK
- Crackington Haven, Cornwall, England, UK
- Keighley, West Yorkshire, England, UK
- Michaelstow, Cornwall, England, UK
- Pencarrow Head, Fowey, Cornwall, England, UK
- Pentire Head, Cornwall, England, UK
- Port Isaac, Cornwall, England, UK
- Port Quin, Cornwall, England, UK
- St Breward, Cornwall, England, UK

== Reception ==
The film received mixed reviews. On the review aggregator website Rotten Tomatoes, 28% of 18 critics' reviews are positive.

In his review in the Chicago Sun-Times, Roger Ebert gave the film two stars, calling it "a disappointment, a film in which good and evil dutifully go through their paces, while the character who could have added complexity and intrigue remains, unfortunately, unrealized."

In their review in Spirituality & Practice, Frederic and Mary Ann Brussat wrote, "Screenplay writer Tim Willocks has done a masterful job delineating the passionate love affair between these two outsiders who find in each other all they need. Even more impressive is director Beeban Kidron's respect for the mystery of human personality."

Terence Davies later cast Rachel Weisz in The Deep Blue Sea after seeing her performance in this film.
