= Under Western Eyes (novel) =

1911 novel by Joseph Conrad

- First edition (US)
- Author: Joseph Conrad
- Language: English
- Genre: Novel
- Publisher: Harper & Brothers (US); Methuen Publishing (UK)
- Publication date: 1911
- Publication place: United Kingdom
- Media type: Print (hardback and paperback)
- Preceded by: The Secret Sharer
- Followed by: Freya of the Seven Isles

Under Western Eyes is a 1911 novel by Joseph Conrad. The novel takes place in St. Petersburg, Russia, and Geneva, Switzerland, and is viewed as Conrad's response to the themes explored in Fyodor Dostoevsky's Crime and Punishment; Conrad was reputed to have detested Dostoevsky. It has also been interpreted as Conrad's response to his own early life; his father was a Polish independence activist and would-be revolutionary imprisoned by the Russians, but, instead of following in his father's footsteps, at the age of sixteen Conrad left his native land, only to return briefly decades later. Indeed, while writing Under Western Eyes, Conrad suffered a weeks-long breakdown during which he conversed with the novel's characters in Polish.

This novel is considered to be one of Conrad's major works and is close in subject matter to The Secret Agent. It is full of cynicism and conflict about the historical failures of revolutionary movements and ideals: "Under Western Eyes contrasts tsarist autocracy and arbitrary power with fanatic idealism and professional revolutionists. The novel is a tour-de-force of intermingling indirect voices, each clamoring for a distinct and persuasive perspective." Conrad remarks in this book, as well as others, on the irrationality of life, the opacity of character, the unfairness with which suffering is inflicted upon the innocent and poor and the careless disregard for the lives of those with whom we share existence.

The book's first audience read it after the failed Russian Revolution of 1905. A later audience reading it after the Russian Revolutions of 1917 perceived the author's insights differently. Writing to Edward Garnett in 1911, Conrad said "...in this book I am concerned with nothing but ideas, to the exclusion of everything else".

== Plot summary ==
=== Part First ===
The narrator, an English teacher of languages living in Geneva, is narrating the personal record of Kyrilo Sidorovitch Razumov. Razumov is a student in the University of St. Petersburg in the early 1910s. Razumov never knew his parents and has no family ties. He is trusted by his fellow students, many of whom hold revolutionary views. Razumov, with no family to fall back on, feels isolated from his contemporaries, takes no interest in the "great issues" of the day, and works toward a middle-class, secure position within the Czarist system.

One night, Mr. de P—, the brutal Minister of State, is assassinated by a team of two, but the bombs used also claim the lives of his footman, the first assassin and a number of bystanders. Razumov enters his rooms to find Victor Haldin, a fellow student. Haldin tells Razumov that he was the one who murdered Mr. de P—, but that he and his accomplice did not make a proper escape plan. He requests Razumov's help because he trusts him, even though he realises that they do not quite belong in the same camp. Razumov agrees to help, if only to get Haldin out of his flat. Haldin tasks him with finding Ziemianitch, who was supposed to help Haldin escape.

Haldin's request launches Razumov into a deep identity crisis. He feels that his life will be destroyed by the authorities simply because of his association with Haldin. Consequently he becomes intensely aware of his social isolation and lack of family ties. Harbouring no sympathy for Haldin's actions or his ideals, Razumov is brought closer to conservatism out of the simple fear to survive. He seeks out Ziemianitch and, when he finds him, drunk and incapacitated, beats him. Afterwards he makes up his mind to betray Haldin to save his own life and turns to his university sponsor, Prince K. They go to the chief of police, General T—. Then a trap is laid for Haldin.

Razumov returns to his apartment and attempts to explain his predicament to Haldin while concealing the fact that he has just betrayed him. Haldin leaves and, later that night, is caught. Razumov is distressed for days after Haldin's capture. In his apartment, he writes down a set of political principles which paint him as a reformist and not a revolutionary. Finally, he receives a summons to the police headquarters and meets Privy Councillor Mikulin. In a scene reminiscent of Crime and Punishment, Razumov is highly paranoid that Mikulin suspects him of being a revolutionary. Mikulin reveals that Haldin was interrogated, sentenced and hanged the same day without implicating Razumov. Mikulin also reveals that he supervised a search of Razumov's quarters and was impressed by his manifesto. Razumov attempts to leave, but Mikulin makes him pause.

=== Part Second ===
The narrative shifts to Haldin's sister, Natalia, and their mother, Mrs Haldin, who live in Switzerland after Haldin persuaded them to sell their house in Russia and move. Having lived in Zurich for a while, they then settle in Geneva, which has a vibrant Russian community. There, they wait for Haldin. Natalia has been friendly with the narrator for some time from whom she receives English lessons.

One day, the narrator chances upon the news of Haldin's arrest and execution in an English newspaper, and tells Natalia and her mother. Natalia takes the news stoically but her mother is deeply distressed. Peter Ivanovitch, a leader in the revolutionary movement, having learnt of Haldin's execution, meets with Natalia and attempts to recruit her, but Natalia is sceptical and noncommittal. He also tells her that Razumov is about to arrive in Geneva, which excites Natalia, as Haldin had described him in glowing terms in his letters.

Natalia is invited to the Chateau Borel, a big, neglected house that Madame de S— rents from the widow of an Italian banker, and meets Tekla, the abused companion of Madame de S— and secretary to Peter Ivanovitch. Tekla recounts her life story. Afterwards, they come upon Peter Ivanovitch and Razumov. Peter Ivanovitch leaves and Natalia introduces herself to Razumov, who feels compassion for her. Tekla, like most of the characters whom Razumov encounters, misinterprets his taciturn cynicism – which is in fact motivated by his hatred for the entire situation he has fallen into – as the expression of a true revolutionist, and pledges her help to him, even to the point of leaving Madame de S— and Peter Ivanovitch.

=== Part Third ===
The narrative shifts back to a few weeks earlier and describes how Razumov arrived in Geneva, having first stayed in Zurich for three days with Sophia Antonovna, the right hand of Peter Ivanovitch. Razumov did not further seek Peter Ivanovitch after their first meeting but instead took long walks with Natalia, where she took him into her confidence and asked about her brother's last hours, to which Razumov gave no definite answer. Razumov is abrasive towards the narrator, who detects a deep distress under Razumov's exterior. He is invited to the Chateau Borel, where he is received on friendly terms, as Madame de S— and Peter Ivanovitch think that he was a collaborator of Haldin. In fact, Razumov has gone to Geneva, working as a spy for the Russian government.

His taciturnity and reserve are interpreted by each character in their own way. The revolutionaries reveal some of their plans to Razumov and he is given his first assignment: to bring Natalia to Peter Ivanovitch so he can convert her, as Peter Ivanovitch cherishes female followers above everything else.

Razumov then meets Sophia Antonovna and comes to see her as his most dangerous adversary because of her single-mindedness and perception. Suppressing his distress, he manages to deceive her. Sophia Antonovna reveals that Ziemianitch hanged himself soon after Haldin's execution, which makes the revolutionaries believe that he was the one who betrayed Haldin.

=== Part Fourth ===
The narrative shifts back to Razumov's initial interview with Mikulin. Mikulin admits having read Razumov's private notes but reassures him that he is not suspicious of him. After telling Razumov that some of the best Russian minds ultimately returned to them (referring to Dostoevsky, Gogol and Aksakov), he lets him go. Razumov spends the next few weeks in an increasing state of malaise where he alienates his fellow students and professors. In the meantime, Mikulin has received a promotion and sees an opportunity to use Razumov. He summons him to further interviews where he recruits him, with the blessings of Prince K., to act as a secret agent for the Czarist authorities of the Russian Empire.

The narrative shifts to Geneva, where Razumov is writing his first report to Mikulin. On his way to the post office, the narrator comes upon him, but Razumov takes no notice of him. The narrator goes to Natalia's flat, only to learn that Natalia must find Razumov urgently and bring him to her distraught mother, as she needs to meet the only friend of Haldin that she knows. The professor and Natalia go to the Cosmopolitan Hotel to ask Peter Ivanovitch where Razumov stays. There, they find the revolutionaries preparing an insurgency in the Baltic provinces. They visit Razumov's lodgings but do not find him. They then return to Natalia's quarters where Razumov has unexpectedly visited her mother. After a long conversation with Natalia in which Razumov makes several obscure and cryptic remarks, and Natalia asks how her brother spent his last hours, Razumov implies that he was the one who betrayed him.

Razumov retires to his quarters where he writes his record. He explains to Natalia that he fell in love with her as soon as she took him into her confidence, that he had never been shown any kind of love before, and that he felt he had betrayed himself by betraying her brother.

He mails the record to Natalia and goes to the house of Julius Laspara where a social gathering of revolutionaries is taking place. Razumov declares to the crowd that Ziemianitch was innocent and explains his motives only partially, but confesses that he was the one who betrayed Haldin. Some revolutionaries, led by Necator, attack him and smash his eardrums. A deaf Razumov is crushed by a tramcar and crippled. Tekla finds him and stays by his side at the hospital.

A few months pass and Mrs Haldin has died. Natalia has returned to Russia to devote herself to charity work after giving Razumov's record to the narrator. Tekla has taken the invalid Razumov to the Russian countryside, where she looks after him.

== Major characters ==
- Kyrilo Sidorovitch Razumov: Razumov is a student in the University of St. Petersburg, a hotbed of revolutionary activity at the time. He is described as a serious young man, studious and hard working. He survives on a modest allowance provided by Prince K., his sponsor. Having known no family, he considers all of Russia his family. Handsome and aristocratic in appearance, he inspires trust in people by his obliging manner and attentive listening. His ultimate ambition before de P—'s assassination was to become a professor or a Privy Councillor. Deeply aware of the fact that he has no meaningful connections to anyone, he relies on his hard work as a means of advancement. Razumov is held in high esteem by the Geneva revolutionaries because they think he was a collaborator of Haldin. In fact, after Haldin's arrest, Razumov is nerve-wracked and paranoid. He holds the revolutionaries in contempt and often makes sarcastic sneers, something that confuses them. He falls in love with Natalia Haldin but having never known neither love nor family, his identity crumbles, and he finally confesses to her that he betrayed her brother.
- Victor Victorovich Haldin: A fellow student of Razumov, he assassinates Mr de P., but several innocent bystanders are killed as well. With his escape plan compromised, he breaks into Razumov's rooms and asks for his help. Haldin is highly idealistic but has mistaken Razumov's studiousness and thoughtfulness for trustworthiness. He does not realise that placing Razumov into an impossible situation can have unpredictable consequences for him. Haldin mentions an uncle who was executed under Nicholas I.
- Natalia Victorovna Haldin: The independent-minded and sincere sister of Victor Haldin, she is not impressed by Peter Ivanovitch. She is described as "full-figured" with "trustful eyes". She has a confident manner and a reputation for liberalism. She was educated in an institute for women (women were not easily allowed to study at university) where she was looked upon unfavourably because of her views. Both mother and daughter were later placed under surveillance in their country place. Natalia thinks that by befriending Razumov, she will stay faithful to the spirit of her brother, as he had described Razumov in his letters as possessing a "lofty, unstained and solitary" existence. She is suspicious of the circumstances of Haldin's capture, as she thinks he would have had an escape plan.
- Peter Ivanovitch: The bombastic leader of the revolutionaries, Ivanovitch served in the Guards when he was young. He is very popular in Russia but lives in Geneva sponsored by Madame de S— and constantly flatters her. In his autobiography, he recounts how he was imprisoned in Russia and made a dramatic escape to the Pacific coast with the help of a woman. He is considered a revolutionary feminist but regularly mistreats Tekla and is a profligate author of numerous books. In the end, Peter Ivanovitch is portrayed as ineffectual, having allowed not one but two informers in his circle. When Madame de S— dies, she leaves none of her fortune to Peter Ivanovitch, who marries a peasant girl and moves back to Russia, but he is still deeply admired by his believers. Peter Ivanovitch is mainly based on Mikhail Bakunin, while his feminist theories seem inspired from Fyodor Dostoevsky (in his "Notes from the Underground" (1864), part 2, chapter 1, there is a reference to this name). Also in Tolstoi's "The Death of Ivan Ilyich" (1886) there is a character with the same name, referred since the first page. There was, in addition, a Russian ambassador for the US, from 1817 to 1822, named Pyotr Ivanovich Poletika (1778–1849).
- Sophia Antonovna: The right hand of Peter Ivanovitch, Antonovna is an old revolutionary who is held in high regard because she is being trusted by Peter Ivanovitch with carrying out "certain most important things". She is the daughter of a clever but unlucky artisan, who was brutally exploited by his masters and died at fifty. She, therefore, became a revolutionary despite her youth. She is quick to see that Razumov is not particularly impressed with them. Razumov views her as "the true spirit of destructive revolution" because she is devoid of the mysticism and rhetoric of Ivanovitch. He makes serious efforts in deceiving her and takes pleasure when he succeeds. In the end, Antonovna admits to the narrator that she bears a grudging respect for Razumov because he confessed of his own volition and from a position of safety.
- Tekla: The dame de compagnie of Madame de S—, Tekla was the daughter of a clerk in the Finance Ministry. Distressed by seeing her family living on a government salary when half of Russia was starving, she left them at a young age to live with revolutionaries where she went through great hardship. As a result, she has sustained a hatred of Finance Ministries and has done odd jobs for revolutionaries. She takes dictation from the psychologically abusive Ivanovitch. Razumov notes that Tekla is perpetually terrified in the presence of Madame de S— and Peter Ivanovitch. At the end of the novel, she takes a crippled Razumov back to Russia and looks after him. It has been suggested that Conrad was influenced by the legend of Saint Thecla to create Tekla.

== Minor characters ==
- The narrator: A passive, obscure teacher of languages. Conrad often uses that device to elaborate his views on Russia. He wishes to advise Natalia but because he is old and a Westerner, he feels the gap between them is too big for Natalia to listen to him.
- Mrs Haldin: The world-weary old mother of Victor and Natalia, she becomes suspicious when she does not receive news of Victor for some time after Mr. de P—'s assassination. After she learns of his execution, she falls ill. When she learns of Razumov, she wants to meet him. In the end of the novel, she dies. She is described as having had a fine, lucid intellect in her youth.
- Prince K.: A Russian aristocrat and ex-Guardsman who acts as Razumov's sponsor, it is also implied he is Razumov's father. Before P’s assassination Razumov had met him only once, when he was summoned to the office of an obscure attorney, and Prince K. encouraged him to do well in his studies and shook his hand. He is married to an aristocratic lady, who has a temper and is rumoured to beat him. Razumov turns to Prince K. for help after he finds Haldin in his room, having no other person to rely on. Prince K is angry at first but afterwards takes Razumov to General T— and clarifies that Razumov is not involved in revolutionary activity.
- Privy Councillor Gregory Gregorievitch/Matvievitch Mikulin: The subtle Head of Department at the Secretariat General, he is the right hand of General T—. He subjects Razumov to several interviews, successfully trying to recruit him to act as an informer for the Czarist authorities against the revolutionaries. He does this partly for his own reasons, as he views Razumov as a tool that he can use after he receives a promotion to general supervisor over European operations. A hedonistic and greatly influential official. He meets his end a few years after the events of the novel as the consequence of a state trial.
- General T—: Modelled after Fyodor Trepov, General T— is a high official in the Secretariat General of the Ministry of Interior of the police secretariat, to whom Razumov betrays Haldin's escape plan. General T— is initially suspicious of Razumov, but his mind is set at ease by Prince K., who vouches for Razumov's character. He believes that the structure of society is based on fidelity to institutions, and he has a deep hatred of revolutionaries that he describes as natural.
- Mr de P—: The brutal and repressive Minister of State in the Czarist government. Fanatical and single-minded, he imprisoned, exiled or condemned to execution revolutionaries of every age and gender. He does not believe in liberty and justifies this using religion. He is assassinated by Haldin in a scene based on the real-life assassination of Vyacheslav von Plehve.
- Baroness Eleanora Maximovna de S—: The pretentious widow of a Russian diplomat, she left Russia some years before the events of the novel because she was suspected of having had foreknowledge of the assassination of Alexander II of Russia. She is an ardent believer in Ivanovich and met him when he was serving in the Guards as a young man, and she supports him financially in Geneva. Razumov describes her as looking like a "galvanised corpse". She is described as greedy, avaricious and unscrupulous by the narrator.
- Nikita Necator: A brutal revolutionary assassin, Necator is responsible for numerous murders and has a fearsome reputation. Fat to the point of obesity, he is greatly excited by violence. He cripples Razumov near the end of the novel by smashing his eardrums. In the end, Councillor Mikulin informs Ivanovitch in a chance meeting in Russia that Necator had been a double agent all along, providing information to the Russian authorities. Razumov was apparently aware of this as he taunted Necator before he was attacked. He bears many similarities to the historical double agent Yevno Azev.

== Publication history ==
The novel was initially published in 1911, when the failed revolution of 1905 in Russia was history. Conrad started work on the novel soon after his fiftieth birthday. In this version "Razumov", the story that would become Under Western Eyes, over the next two years, was intended to extend and rework ideas in the plot of The Secret Agent. When Conrad finally delivered the completed manuscript to his agent at the end of January 1910, the occasion itself proved explosive and led to a breach in relation that lasted two years. J.B. Pinker, to whom Conrad was very heavily in debt, seems to have lost patience with his author's pace of work and precipitated a quarrel. Shortly after a heated exchange, Conrad collapsed, his doctor diagnosing "a complete nervous breakdown" that had "been coming for months".

Describing her husband's breakdown, Jessie Conrad wrote: "he lives mixed up in the scenes and hold converse with the characters" of Under Western Eyes. Elsewhere she recalls how Conrad, in delirium, "spoke all the time in Polish, but for a few fierce sentences against poor J.B. Pinker" His delusions apparently included symptoms of persecution mania.

In 1920, Conrad wrote an Author's Note for this novel, reflecting on its changed perception due to events of history, specifically the Russian Revolution of 1917. He said "It must be admitted that by the mere force of circumstances Under Western Eyes has become already a sort of historical novel dealing with the past."

The novel is fundamentally connected to Russian history. Its first audience read it against the backdrop of the failed Revolution of 1905 and in the shadow of the movements and impulses that would take shape as the revolutions of 1917. Despite Conrad's protestations that Dostoevsky was "too Russian for me" and that Russian literature generally was "repugnant to me hereditarily and individually", critics have long discerned the influence of Crime and Punishment on this work.

== Adaptations ==
The novel was adapted into a film in 1936; and into a full-length opera by John Joubert in 1969, first performed by New Opera Company at Sadler's Wells Theatre in London. It was also adapted into a stageplay that premiered at Teatr Polski in Warsaw on June 8, 2018.
