= Corina Brouder =

American singer-songwriter

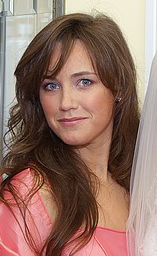

Background information
- Born: Date of birth unknown Bronx, New York, U.S.
- Genres: Irish, pop
- Occupations: Singer, harpist
- Instruments: Harp, singing
- Years active: 1995–present

Corina Brouder is an American singer and harpist, born in The Bronx, New York City. As a child, her sister, Christina, spent some time in hospital after a hit and run incident, and Corina and her other siblings started entertaining her recovering sister and the other children in the ward. Eventually the family found themselves in demand to perform at similar venues, and, calling themselves The Spirits of Gilbride, began performing professionally. The group consists of Corina, Christina, Cornelia, Neil and Mary Catherine. Corina and Cornelia do most of the singing and between them the band play keyboards, violin, harp, guitar, drums, tin whistle, bagpipes and accordion. The group released an album, two videos and singles for Universal Music, and sang the title track on the European version of The Little Vampire (2000) soundtrack album.

Brouder was discovered by John Barry and sang "To Love and be Loved" on his Swept from the Sea (1997) soundtrack with lyrics by Tim Rice. She started performing more frequently on her own, often accompanying herself on harp or keyboards, and visited Ireland in 2004 to promote her single, "Another Day," which was recorded in New York City with Swedish record producer Johan Brunkvist. The "B" side, "Change," was written by Brouder and remixed by Joe Hogue.

Brouder appeared on season 1 of America's Got Talent in 2006 and was chosen by David Hasselhoff to perform in the "Wild Card episode." She was joined for one episode by her sister, Cornelia.

Brouder also attended Fiorello H. LaGuardia High School of Music & Art and Performing Arts and has a BA from Fordham University. Her siblings have taken on other careers. Christina is a lawyer, Cornelia is a lawyer, Neil is an Environmental Engineer and Mary Catherine is a journalist. Corina now performs solo, accompanying herself on the harp or piano. She also adds vocals and music to various projects.

In 2017, she became a licensed attorney and is an Associate at Zetlin and De Chiara. Additionally Brouder retains current licenses in nursing, cosmetology and as a real estate broker.She is also a certified cantor for the Archdiocese of New York.

Brouder and her husband have two children.

== Albums ==
- (1994) Sibling Revelry, USA
- (2000) Gilbride, Germany, Metronome (Universal)

== Singles ==
=== With The Spirits Of Gilbride ===
- (2000) "Shades of Grey", Germany, Metronome (Universal)
- (2000) "I Can't Help Fallin'", Germany, Metronome (Universal)

=== Solo ===
- (2004) "Feel For You", Brouder
- (2004) "Another Day", Brouder Music, Ltd
