= Outcast of the Islands =

- original movie poster
- Directed by: Carol Reed
- Screenplay by: William Fairchild
- Based on: An Outcast of the Islands; 1896 novel by Joseph Conrad
- Produced by: Carol Reed
- Starring: Trevor Howard; Ralph Richardson; Robert Morley; Wendy Hiller
- Cinematography: Edward Scaife; John Wilcox
- Edited by: Bert Bates
- Music by: Brian Easdale
- Color process: Black and white
- Production company: London Film Productions
- Distributed by: British Lion Films Corporation
- Release date: 18 January 1952 (London)
- Running time: 100 minutes
- Country: United Kingdom
- Language: English
- Box office: £149,335 (UK)

Outcast of the Islands is a 1952 British adventure drama film directed by Carol Reed and starring Trevor Howard, Ralph Richardson, Robert Morley and Wendy Hiller. The screenplay was by William Fairchild based on Joseph Conrad's 1896 novel An Outcast of the Islands.

== Plot ==
Peter Willems, a selfish and ambitious man, is accused of stealing in his position as manager of a shipping port operation near Singapore. After he is dismissed for his misconduct he reacquaints himself with the trading ship Capt. Lingard who befriended him as a 12-year-old boy. Lingard agrees to help Willems regain his reputation by taking him to a trading village located up a difficult-to-navigate channel near the coast of Batam. Lingard's son-in-law, Elmer Almayer, operates a trading operation for Capt. Lingard in the village. Lingard asks Almayer to take Willems under his wing and teach him the business.

While Lingard is away on one of his sea trips, Willems abuses his trust, seduces the village chieftain's daughter Aissa, attempts to steal Almayer's business operation, humiliates Almayer before the villagers, and shares the navigation secrets of the channel with an Arab trader who competes with Capt. Lingard. Lingard returns to discover the mess Willems has made and confronts Willems – who has now been condemned by the villagers because of the shame he brought to the frail and dying chieftain. He abandons Willems to live in isolation and exile.

== Cast ==
- Trevor Howard as Willems
- Ralph Richardson as Captain Lingard
- Robert Morley as Elmer Almayer
- Wendy Hiller as Mrs. Almayer
- Kerima as Aissa
- George Coulouris as Babalatchi
- Tamine as Tamine
- Wilfrid Hyde-White as Vinck
- Peter Illing as Alagappa
- Betty Ann Davies as Mrs Williams
- Frederick Valk as Hudig
- A. V. Bramble as Badavi
- Marne Maitland as ship's mate
- James Kenney as Ramsey
- Annabel Morley as Nina Almayer
- Ranjana as dancer (as T. Ranjana)
- K. Gurunanse as dancer

== Production ==
In the wake of the success of The Blue Lagoon, Alexander Korda was able to get funding for a Outcast of the Islands. It was filmed on location in Ceylon (now Sri Lanka) and at Shepperton Studios in England.

== Reception ==
The Monthly Film Bulletin wrote: "The basic mistake of this adaptation seems to lie in the script, which is so overwhelmed by the narrative itself that the characters and relationships fail mostly to crystallise. Even so, some painstaking condensation still obliges the film to end two-thirds of the way through the novel (in which Aissa finally kills Willems). One can see how Reed was approaching the subject – an anti-romantic view of the East, not beautiful, not exotic, but a squalid wasteland in which only Lingard and some of the poverty-stricken natives preserve any human dignity. One has a suspicion that the film has been overshot, and in being cut down to 100 minutes has been reduced more and more to the bare outlines of the story."

Variety wrote: "Reed has not succeeded in extracting the suspense normally associated with his work. Film is somewhat overlong and shows signs of substantial scissoring in an endeavor to keep it within reasonable bounds. John Wilcox has lensed the production skillfully while Brian Easdale has contributed a satisfying musical score."

Picturegoer wrote: "Few directors can, in the first quarter of an hour of a film, achieve a really convincing atmosphere and also give an incisive introduction to the characters of the story. Fewer again, I would imagine, could pull it off where one of Joseph Conrad's novels is being brought to the screen, for the author is an expert at atmosphere building chapter by chapter. But with this film, Carol Reed proves he is one of the select few. In fact, his handling of this Conrad work confirms his position as one of our best directors. And he doesn't forget to give us flashes of his somewhat impish humour that can always be associated with his work."

Picture Show wrote: "Superbly beautiful Eastern settings back an enthralling story, intelligently acted, and skilfully directed. Trevor Howard is outstanding in a new field – villainy – for he takes the role of a degenerate white man who betrays all the laws of decency and loyalty to satisfy his own desires, when he falls violently in love with the daughter of a native chief. The repercussions of his arrival at the Jondlys trading post where this happens are violent and exciting, and the retribution is unusually satisfying. Sir Ralph Richardson is excellent as the kindly, loyal trading schooner captain, and these two head a splendidly-chosen cast. Don't miss this."

Film critic, Pauline Kael, said of the film that the story takes place in Hong Kong but could just as easily have been told in Southern California, meaning that the location shots were used to make the familiar seem unusual.

== Accolades ==
Outcast of the Islands was nominated for best British film and best film from any source at the 1953 BAFTA awards.

== Home media ==
Outcast of the Islands was released on home video by Kino Lorber on April 28, 2020 as a Region 1 Blu-Ray.
