= The Spirits of Gilbride =

The Spirits of Gilbride is a musical group who formed as a result of a drunk driver incident. New Yorker Christina Brouder was knocked down near her home in the Bronx and seriously injured. This led to a long period in hospital and, to alleviate the boredom and to cheer her up, her visiting siblings, Corina, Cornelia, Neil & Mary Catherine began performing in the ward. Word got around and after Christina fully recovered they began to perform together in other local hospitals, nursing homes and eventually at charity events.

The children learned to play a variety of musical instruments, including violin, harp, keyboards, drums, fiddle, bagpipes, accordion, tin whistle, and guitar. Corina and Cornelia took care of the vocals. They decided to call themselves the Spirits of Gilbride, Gilbride being the family name of their late grandfather.

The group made their first album, Sibling Revelry, in 1994, and in 2001 came Gilbride, released by Universal Music. They also shot two videos to promote the album and recorded the title track for the European release of the 2000 film, The Little Vampire. They have performed in venues all over America, including The White House, and in Germany, Ireland, Great Britain, Denmark, and Austria.

== Discography ==
- Sibling Revelry (1994) United States
- Gilbride (2000) Germany, Metronome (Universal)
- "Shades of Grey" (2000) Germany, Metronome (Universal)
- "I Can't Help Fallin'" (2000) Germany, Metronome (Universal)

Additionally The Spirits of Gilbride accompanied Corina Brouder on her singles

- "Feel for You" (2004) Brouder
- "Another Day" (2004) Brouder Music, Ltd
