= Falk (short story) =

"Falk: A Reminiscence"
- Short story by Joseph Conrad
- Country: United Kingdom
- Language: English

Publication
- Published in: Typhoon and Other Stories
- Publication date: 1903

"Falk: A Reminiscence" is a work of short fiction by Joseph Conrad. The story was completed in May 1901 and was collected in Typhoon and Other Stories in 1903, published by William Heinemann and Company.

== Plot ==
The story is told as a narrative, describing the observations of a youthful commander of a merchant vessel serving in the Malay Archipelago The story opens with an apparent rivalry between two men over a young woman. The narrator-captain is a thirty-year-old newly commissioned officer employed by the Dutch East India Company. He struggles to bring some order to the fiscal affairs of the ship, whose previous commander had neglected his duties, indulging in writing obscene poetry and keeping a harlot on shore. Delayed in port, the narrator-captain often visits the vessel Diana, commanded by the patriarch Hermann who is accompanied by his wife and four children, as well as a pretty niece. The domesticity of the ship is initially reassuring to the young man.

Falk is the owner of the only tugboat in the harbor. He is in love with the niece, and suspects the narrator-captain of being a rival. He refuses to service the captain’s vessel. Falk briefly hijacks the Diana so as to keep the girl away from his presumed competitor. Falk’s suspicions are unfounded, and the narrator, after demonstrating he has no designs on the niece, agrees to support Falk’s proposal to wed the girl. A contretemps arises when Falk insists that a lurid episode from his past be first exposed: he had once murdered a man while on board a stranded ship, and resorted to cannibalism to survive. Captain Hermann, the girl’s uncle, at first finds this fact so repellent he refuses to give his consent, but ultimately relents. The couple is happily joined in marriage.

== Background ==
At 30,499 words, "Falk" required serialization if it was to be published in a literary journal. Both Conrad and his agent J. B. Pinker made repeated efforts to see it published in Blackwood’s Magazine, but without success. The work was ultimately collected in Typhoon and Other Stories (1903). "Falk" is one of only two of his short stories that never appeared in serial form. Despite this, Conrad remained fond of this tale, and considered it the best story in the collection.

== Theme ==
The story is notable as one of only a few of Conrad’s work with a "happy" ending. Biographer Jocelyn Baines reminds her readers that Falk "is treated primarily as a comic figure." "Falk"’s opening has the same structure as two of Conrad’s previous works, " Youth" (1898) and ‘Heart of Darkness"(1899): An autobiographical tale is told at an intimate gathering of mariners, now in their maturity. Literary critic Albert J. Guerard locates "Falk" among "the short personal novels of test and initiation" based on experiences "real or imagined associated with Conrad’s first voyage as captain."

Conrad presents the Hermann family and their ship as an artificial sanctuary from the primitive, elemental realities inherent in seafaring: The inhabitants of the Diana "know nothing of the world of instinct." The Hermann clan, with their self-complacency, cherish their conventionality and are content to live pure, yet "insignificant lives." Jocelyn Baines describes them as "the epitome of bourgeois virtue and limitations." Only one of the seven members of the Hermann family deviates from convention, the "lovely, taciturn niece" who exhibits qualities "that are raw and still vital."

Reminiscent of a country cottage in its cleanliness and good order, the Diana contrasts sharply with the degenerate atmosphere that characterizes the Schomberg hotel, a den of "deceit" and "malice." The young captain finds himself suspended between these two worlds.

Falk, the owner the local tugboat, represents a preternatural power. Literary critic Laurence Grave provides this sketch of Falk:

Strong and inarticulate, always associated with his tug, he reminds the narrator-captain of a centaur…seen always from the waist up on deck. At the start of the action, he is a disagreeable, miserly, anti-social extortionist —and the captain’s nemesis —but his masculine force is undeniable.

Falk maintains a fine impartiality in his contempt towards the moralistic Hermann and the perfidious Schomberg. Despite the tugboat captain’s flaunting conventionality and "common decency", the narrator-captain begins to appreciate Falk’s lack of duplicity, which contrasts with "the sterile atmosphere that surrounds life in the port, where the air is thick with misapprehension, half-truths, and malicious innuendo."

The central thematic element is examined after the tugboat operator and the narrator-captain are reconciled and Falk insists that he must reveal his secret: "I have eaten a man." An act of cannibalism, committed on a becalmed ship of starving men, emerges as a moral imperative to preserve the life of the survivors.

Captain Hermann is "treated as a comic figure" when he counsels Falk that "it is the duty of a human being to starve" when faced with surviving by eating human flesh. Quickly abandoning his own moralizing, the uncle gives his blessing to the union.

The denouement of "Falk" finds the protagonist triumphant, a heroic figure whose single-minded devotion to self-preservation has won him the spirited young niece of the Diana.

== Sources ==
- Baines, Jocelyn. 1960. Joseph Conrad: A Critical Biography, McGraw-Hill Book Company, New York. ISBN 978-0297167556
- Graver, Laurence. 1969. Conrad’s Short Fiction. University of California Press, Berkeley, California. ISBN 0-520-00513-9
- Guerard, Albert J. 1965. Conrad: The Novelist. Harvard University Press, Cambridge, Massachusetts. LOC Catalog Card Number 58-8995. ISBN 978-0674163508
- Said, Edward W. 1966. The Past and Present: Conrad’s Shorter Fiction, from Said’s Joseph Conrad and the Fiction of Autobiography.Harvard University Press, in Joseph Conrad: Modern Critical Reviews, Harold Bloom editor. Chelsea House Publishers. 1987 pp. 29–51 ISBN 0-87754-642-8
