= Youth (Conrad short story) =

1898 short story by Joseph Conrad

- Short story by Joseph Conrad
- Country: United Kingdom
- Language: English
- Genre: Frame story

Publication
- Published in: Blackwood's Magazine
- Media type: Print (Serial)
- Publication date: 1898

"Youth" is an autobiographical short story by Joseph Conrad first published in Blackwood's Magazine in 1898 and collected in the eponymous collection Youth, A Narrative; and Two Other Stories in 1902.

This volume also includes the novella Heart of Darkness and The End of the Tether, "assembled by a publisher with no artistic rationale beyond that of hitting a favorable page count". Conrad intended "Youth" to be published in a trilogy consisting of three Marlow stories: "Youth", Heart of Darkness, and Lord Jim — "Eastern sea stories that are all based on factual events and personages about British commanding officers on unseaworthy ships; all constructed as non-chronological frame-narratives; and all told in the style of a real-life raconteur speaking to an audience of close acquaintances, in informal and safe settings." The economics of publishing did not support the odd pairing of a story and a novella with a lengthy novel. Thus, "the trilogy conceived by the author as a single book with 'unity of artistic purpose,' what we might now call a composite novel, has never been published, while a different trilogy [Youth: A Narrative and Two Other Stories] . . . has remained in print and widely read for a century".

"Youth" depicts a young man's first journey to the Far East. It is narrated by Charles Marlow who is also the narrator of Lord Jim, Chance, and Heart of Darkness. The narrator's introduction suggests this is the first time, chronologically, the character Marlow appears in Conrad's works (the narrator comments that he thinks Marlow spells his name this way).

"Youth" is a dramatic rendering of Conrad's experience on the vessel Palestine in 1881.

== Plot ==
"Youth" begins with a narrator describing five men drinking claret around a mahogany table. They are all veterans of the merchant navy. One of the men, Marlow, speaks of his first voyage to the East as second mate on board the Judea. The story is set 22 years earlier, when Marlow was 20. With two years of experience, most recently as third mate aboard a crack clipper, Marlow receives a billet as second mate on the barque Judea. The skipper is Captain John Beard, a man of about 60. This is Beard's first command. The Judea is an old boat, belonging to a man "Wilmer, Wilcox or something similar", suffering from age and disuse in Shadewell Basin. The 400-ton ship is commissioned to take 600 tons of coal from England to Thailand. The trip should take approximately 150 days. The ship leaves London loaded with sand ballast and heads north to the Tyne estuary to pick up the cargo of coal. On her way, the Judea suffers from her ballast shifting aside and the crew go below to put things right again. The trip takes 16 days because of "the famous October gale of twenty-two years ago", and the battered ship must use a tug boat to get into port. The Judea waits a month on the Tyne to be loaded with coal. The night before she ships out she is hit by a steamer, the Miranda or the Melissa. The damage takes another three weeks to repair. Three months after leaving London, the Judea ships off for Bangkok.

The Judea travels through the North Sea and Britain. Three hundred miles west of the Lizard, a fiery winter storm hits. The storm "guts" the Judea; she is stripped of her stanchions, ventilators, bulwarks, cabin-door, and deck house. The oakum is stripped from her bottom seams and the men are forced to work at the pumps "watch and watch" to keep the ship afloat. After weathering the storm they must fight their way against the wind back to Falmouth to be refitted. Despite three attempts to leave, the Judea ultimately remains in Falmouth for more than six months until she is finally overhauled, recaulked, and refitted with new copper hull sheathing. During the laborious overhaul, the cargo is wetted, knocked about, and reloaded multiple times. The rats abandon the reshipped barque and a new crew is brought in from Liverpool (because no sailor will sail on a ship abandoned by rats). The Judea ships out to Bangkok, running at times 8 knots, but mostly averaging 3 miles per hour. Near the coast of Western Australia, the cargo spontaneously combusts. The crew attempts to smother the fire, but the hull cannot be made airtight. Then they attempt to flood the fire with water, but they cannot fill the hull. One hundred and ninety miles out from Java Head, the gasses in the hull explode and blow up the deck; Marlow is hurled into the air and falls on the burning debris of the deck.

The Judea hails a passing steamer, the Sommerville, which agrees to tow the wounded ship to Anjer or Batavia. Captain Beard intends to scuttle the Judea there to put out the fire, and then resurface her and resume the voyage to Bangkok. However, the speed of the Sommerville fans the smoldering fire into flames. The crew of the Judea is forced to send the steamer on without them while they attempt to save possibly most of the ship's gear for the underwriters. The gear is loaded into three small boats, which head due north towards Java. Before the crew leaves the Judea, they enjoy a last meal on deck. Marlow is excited to take command of the smallest of the ship's three boats. All the boats make it safely into a Java port, where they book passage on the steamer Celestial, which is on her return trip to England.

== Critical assessment ==
"Pass the bottle!" —Conrad's Marlow in "Youth" (1898)

An autobiographical work, "Youth" represents one of the few stories in Conrad's oeuvre that offer an unalloyed "happy" ending. Author Albert J. Guerard offers this appraisal of the story:

The reason for the story's serenity, almost unique in Conrad's work, is simple enough: it is the only personal story in which the would-be initiate learns nothing, being still too young to learn. The beautiful nautical detail of "Youth", the thinness of its psycho-moral content, the clear but slightly mannered style, the recurring sentimentality of Marlow – these suggest what Conrad's work would have been like had he not evolved important conflicts and anxieties.

Guerard characterizes "Youth" as "the least interesting" of Conrad's works and "may be the closest to the author's waking experience in its nostalgic backward glance."

== Style and theme ==
With "Youth", Conrad introduces his alter ego, that of British high seas mariner Charles Marlow, here at age 42, reminiscing on a formative voyage when, at 20 years of age, he served as the ship's second mate. The story's "essential subject" is that of the "romantic egoist...whose ideal conception of his own personality leads to disaster and an ambiguous redemption." Literary critic Laurence Graver characterizes Marlow's outlook as a challenge to the patronization of youth's excess by their elders, and rather celebrates "the important and unique opportunity" that arises when the young are briefly endowed with a sense of "illusion" that permits them to act with audacity before life becomes "tentative and morally compromising." Graver adds the tale "is a celebration of adolescent strength and enthusiasm tempered by a clear recognition of its shortcoming and its transitory nature."

Biographer Joyelyn Baines comments on the utility of the character Marlow in the presentation of Conrad's narratives:

As "Youth" was aiming at a straightforward effect, Marlow's role was simple: to give tone to the narrative. Conrad must have felt at ease with the style which the use of Marlow allowed him [and] the advantage of having a character that could both tell and comment upon the story...

Literary critic Ian Watt identifies American author Henry James as the inspiration for Marlow, permitting Conrad to adopt "an indirect narrative approach through the sensitive central intelligence of one of the characters."

Marlow appears in a number of Conrad's stories, including Heart of Darkness (1898), Lord Jim (1900), and Chance (1913), where the character was given "an increasingly complex role."

== Publication history ==
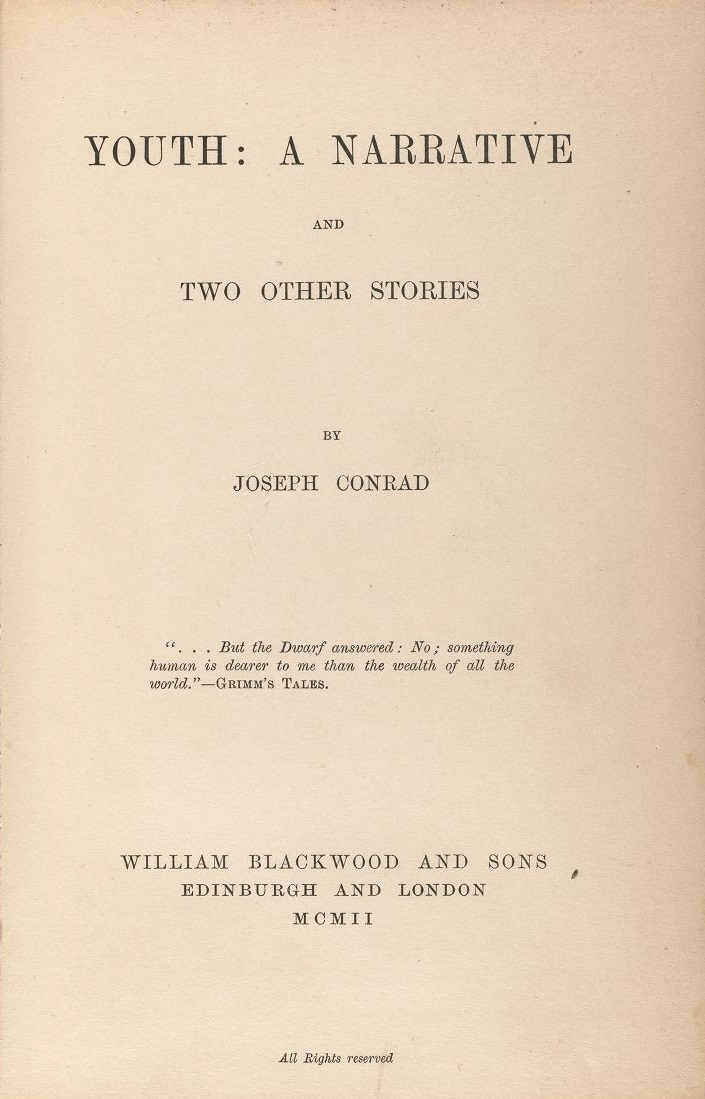
Title page for Youth: A Narrative, and Two Other Stories, 1902

1898 (probably May) – Conrad begins writing "Youth"

3 June 1898 – Conrad finishes writing "Youth"

September 1898 – "Youth" is first published in Blackwood's Magazine

13 November 1902 – the book volume Youth: a Narrative, and Two Other Stories is published by William Blackwood – also contained the stories "Heart of Darkness" and "The End of the Tether"

1903 – First American edition was published by McClure, Phillips

1917 – Second British edition was published by J. M. Dent

1921 – William Heinemann brought out Youth: A Narrative; and The End of a Tether as part of a limited British edition of the collected works

1923 – published by Doubleday in America, and Dent in Britain as part of the first general collected 'editions'

Original forms that are still in existence

- An incomplete manuscript
- A section of typescript
- The Blackwood's Magazine

== Adaptions and works influenced ==
- The Young One – a film adaptation directed by Julien Samani
- "Youth" plays a significant role in the life of the main hero of Graham Swift's novel Mothering Sunday.

== Sources ==
- Baines, Jocelyn. 1960. Joseph Conrad: A Critical Biography, McGraw-Hill Book Company, New York. ISBN 978-0297167556
- Harold Bloom. Chelsea House Publishers. 1987 pp. 83–99 ISBN 0-87754-642-8
- Graver, Laurence. 1969. Conrad's Short Fiction. University of California Press, Berkeley, California. ISBN 0-520-00513-9
- Guerard, Albert J. 1965. Conrad: The Novelist. Harvard University Press, Cambridge, Massachusetts. LOC Catalog Card Number 58-8995. ISBN 978-0674163508
- Said, Edward W. 1966. The Past and Present: Conrad's Shorter Fiction, from Said's Josef Conrad and the Fiction of Autobiography.Harvard University Press, in Joseph Conrad: Modern Critical Reviews, Harold Bloom editor. Chelsea House Publishers. 1987 pp. 29–51 ISBN 0-87754-642-8
- Watt, Ian. 1977. Impressionism and Symbolism in Heart of Darkness (italics). The Southern Review, January 1977 in Joseph Conrad: Modern Critical Reviews, editor Harold Bloom. Chelsea House Publishers. 1987 pp. 83–99 ISBN 0-87754-642-8
