= The Secret Agent =

1907 novel by Joseph Conrad

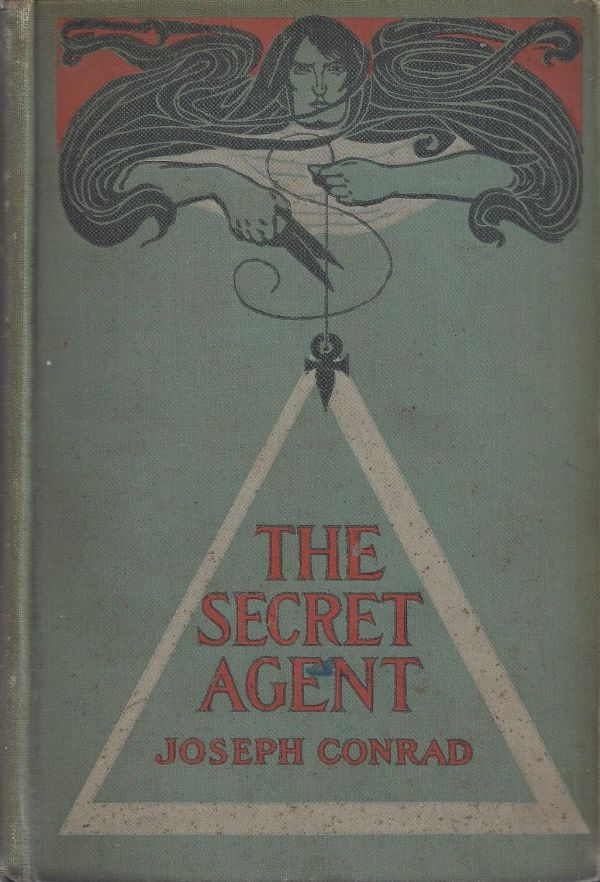
- First US edition cover
- Author: Joseph Conrad
- Language: English
- Genre: Novel, Spy fiction
- Publisher: Methuen & Co
- Publication date: September 12, 1907
- Publication place: United Kingdom
- Media type: Print (hardcover)
- Pages: 442
- Text: The Secret Agent at Wikisource

The Secret Agent: A Simple Tale is an anarchist spy fiction novel by Polish–British author Joseph Conrad, first "printed (1905–1906) as eleven installments in Ridgway's" and published in book form on 12 September 1907. The story is set in Soho, London in 1886 and deals with Mr. Adolf Verloc and his work as a spy for an unnamed country (presumably Russia). The Secret Agent is one of Conrad's later political novels in which he moved away from his tales of seafaring. The novel is dedicated to H. G. Wells and deals broadly with anarchism, espionage and terrorism. It also deals with exploitation of the vulnerable in Verloc's relationship with his brother-in-law Stevie, who has an intellectual disability. Conrad's gloomy portrait of London depicted in the novel was influenced by Charles Dickens' Bleak House.

The novel was adapted as a stage play by Conrad and has since been adapted for film, TV, radio and opera. Because of its terrorism theme, it was one of the three works of literature most cited in the American media two weeks after the September 11 attacks.

== Synopsis ==
Set in Soho, London in 1886, the novel follows the life of Adolf Verloc, a secret agent. Verloc is also a businessman who owns a shop which sells pornographic material, contraceptives and bric-a-brac. He lives with his wife Winnie, his mother-in-law, and his brother-in-law, Stevie. Stevie has a mental disability (possibly autism) which causes him to be excitable; his sister, Verloc's wife, attends to him, treating him more as a son than as a brother. Verloc's friends are a group of anarchists of which Comrade Ossipon, Michaelis and "The Professor" are the most prominent. Although largely ineffectual as terrorists, their actions are known to the police. The group produces anarchist literature in the form of pamphlets entitled F.P., an acronym for The Future of the Proletariat.

The novel begins in Verloc's home, as he and his wife discuss the trivialities of everyday life, which introduces the reader to Verloc's family. Soon after, Verloc leaves to meet Mr Vladimir, the new First Secretary in the embassy of a foreign country, for whom he works as an agent provocateur. Vladimir informs Verloc that from reviewing his service history he is far from an exemplary model of a secret agent and to redeem himself, must carry out an operation – the destruction of Greenwich Observatory by a bomb. Vladimir explains that Britain's lax attitude to anarchism endangers his country and he thinks that an attack on 'science', in vogue amongst the public, will provide the necessary outrage for suppression. Verloc later meets his friends, who discuss politics and law, and the notion of a communist revolution. Unbeknownst to the group, Stevie, Verloc's brother-in-law, overhears the conversation, which greatly disturbs him.

The novel flashes forward to after the bombing has taken place. Comrade Ossipon meets The Professor, who discusses having given explosives to Verloc. The Professor describes the nature of the bomb he carries in his coat at all times: it allows him to press a button which will kill him and those nearest to him in twenty seconds. After The Professor leaves the meeting, he stumbles into Chief Inspector Heat, a policeman investigating a recent explosion at Greenwich, where one man was killed. Heat informs The Professor that he is not a suspect in the case, but that he is being monitored due to his terrorist inclinations and anarchist background. Heat suspects Michaelis. Knowing that Michaelis has recently moved to the countryside to write a book, the Chief Inspector informs the Assistant Commissioner that he has a contact, Verloc, who may be able to assist in the case. The Assistant Commissioner shares some of the same high society acquaintances with Michaelis and is chiefly motivated by finding the extent of Michaelis's involvement in order to assess any possible embarrassment to his connections. He later speaks to his superior, Sir Ethelred, about his intentions to solve the case alone, rather than rely on the effort of Chief Inspector Heat.

The novel flashes back to before the explosion, taking the perspective of Winnie Verloc and her mother. At home, Winnie's mother informs the family that she intends to move out of the house. The move is motivated largely by a desire to avoid straining Adolf Verloc's kindness. Winnie's mother and Stevie use a hansom driven by a man with a hook for a hand. The driver's tales of hardship, whipping of his horse, and menacing hook scare Stevie to the point where Winnie Verloc must calm him. On Verloc's return from a business trip to the continent, his wife tells him of the high regard that Stevie has for him and she implores her husband to spend more time with Stevie. Verloc eventually agrees to go for a walk with Stevie. After this walk, Winnie notes that her husband's relationship with her brother has improved. Verloc tells his wife that he has taken Stevie to go and visit Michaelis, and that Stevie would stay with him in the countryside for a few days.

As Verloc is talking to his wife about the possibility of emigrating to the continent, he is paid a visit by the Assistant Commissioner. Shortly thereafter, Chief Inspector Heat arrives to speak with Verloc, without knowing that the Assistant Commissioner had left with Verloc earlier that evening. The Chief Inspector tells Winnie that he had recovered an overcoat at the scene of the bombing which had the shop's address written on a label. Winnie confirms that it was Stevie's overcoat, and that she had written the address. On Verloc's return, he realises that his wife knows that his bomb killed her brother and confesses what truly happened. A stunned Winnie, in her anguish, fatally stabs her husband.

After the murder, Winnie flees her home, where she chances upon Comrade Ossipon, and begs him to help her. Ossipon assists her while confessing romantic feelings but secretly with a view to possess Mr Verloc's bank account savings. They plan to run away and he aids her in taking a boat to the continent. Her instability and the revelation of Verloc's murder increasingly worry him, and he abandons her, taking Mr Verloc's savings with him. He later discovers in a newspaper that a woman matching Winnie's description disappeared from the ferry, leaving behind her wedding ring before drowning herself in the English Channel.

== Characters ==
- Adolf Verloc: a secret agent who owns a shop in Soho in London. His primary characteristic, as described by Conrad, is indolence. He has been employed by an unnamed embassy to spy on revolutionary groups, which then orders him to instigate a terrorist act against the Greenwich Observatory. Their belief is that the resulting public outrage will force the British government to act more forcibly against émigré socialist and anarchist activists. He is part of an anarchist organisation that creates pamphlets under the heading The Future of the Proletariat. He is married to Winnie, and lives with his wife, his mother-in-law, and his brother-in-law, Stevie.
- Winifred "Winnie" Verloc: Verloc's wife. She cares deeply for her brother Stevie, who has the mental age of a young child. Of working class origins, her father was the owner of a pub. She is younger than her husband and married him not for love but to provide a home for her mother and brother. A loyal wife, she is disturbed upon learning of the death of her brother due to her husband's plotting, and kills him with a knife in the heart. She dies, presumably by drowning herself to avoid the gallows.
- Stevie: Winnie's brother has the mental age of a young child. He is sensitive and is disturbed by notions of violence or hardship. His sister cares for him, and Stevie passes most of his time drawing numerous circles on pieces of paper. Verloc, exploiting both Stevie's childlike simplicity and his outrage at suffering, employs him to carry out the bombing of Greenwich Observatory. Stevie stumbles and the bomb explodes prematurely, killing him.
- Winnie Verloc's mother: old and infirm, Winnie's mother leaves the household to live in an almshouse, believing that two disabled people (herself and Stevie) are too much for Mr Verloc's generosity. The widow of a publican, she spent most of her life working hard in her husband's pub and believes Mr Verloc to be a gentleman because she thinks he resembles patrons of business houses (pubs with higher prices, consequently frequented by the upper classes).
- Chief Inspector Heat: a policeman who is dealing with the explosion at Greenwich. An astute, practical man who uses a clue found at the scene of the crime to trace events back to Verloc's home. Although he informs his superior what he is planning to do with regards to the case, he is initially not aware that the Assistant Commissioner is acting without his knowledge. Heat knew Verloc before the bombing as Verloc had supplied information to Heat through the embassy. Heat despises anarchists, whom he regards as amateurs, as opposed to burglars, whom he regards as professionals.
- The Assistant Commissioner: of a higher rank than the Chief Inspector, he uses the knowledge gained from Heat to pursue matters personally, for reasons of his own. The Assistant Commissioner is married to a lady with influential connections. He informs his superior, Sir Ethelred, of his intentions, and tracks down Verloc before Heat can.
- Sir Ethelred: a secretary of state (Home Secretary), to whom the Assistant Commissioner reports. At the time of the bombing he is busy trying to pass a bill regarding the nationalisation of fisheries through the House of Commons against strong opposition. He is briefed by the Assistant Commissioner throughout the novel and often admonishes him not to go into detail.
- Mr Vladimir: First Secretary of the embassy of an unnamed country. Though his name might suggest that this is the Russian embassy, the name of the previous first secretary, Baron Stott-Wartenheim, is Germanic, as is that of Privy Councillor Wurmt, another official of this embassy. There is also the suggestion that Vladimir is not from Europe but Central Asia. Vladimir thinks that the 'English' police are far too soft on émigré socialists and anarchists, who are a real problem in his home country. He orders Verloc to instigate a terrorist act, hoping that the resulting public outrage will force the British government to adopt repressive measures.
- Michaelis: a member of Verloc's group, and another anarchist. The most philosophical member of the group.
- Comrade Alexander Ossipon: an ex-medical student, anarchist and member of Verloc's group. He survives on the savings of women he seduces, mostly working-class women. He is influenced by the theories on degeneracy of Cesare Lombroso. After Verloc's murder he initially helps, but afterwards abandons Winnie, leaving her penniless on a train. He is later disturbed when he reads of her suicide and wonders if he will be able to seduce a woman again.
- Karl Yundt: a member of Verloc's group, commonly referred to as an "old terrorist".
- The Professor: another anarchist, who specializes in explosives. The Professor carries a flask of explosives in his coat, which can be detonated within twenty seconds of him squeezing an India rubber ball in his pocket. The police know this and keep their distance. The most nihilistic member of the anarchists, the Professor feels oppressed and disgusted by the rest of humanity and has particular contempt for the weak, whom he blames for all his troubles. He dreams of a world where the weak are freely exterminated so that the strong (himself) can thrive. He supplies to Verloc the bomb that kills Stevie. (The Professor also appears as a character in Conrad's short story "The Informer.")

== Background: Greenwich Bombing of 1894 ==
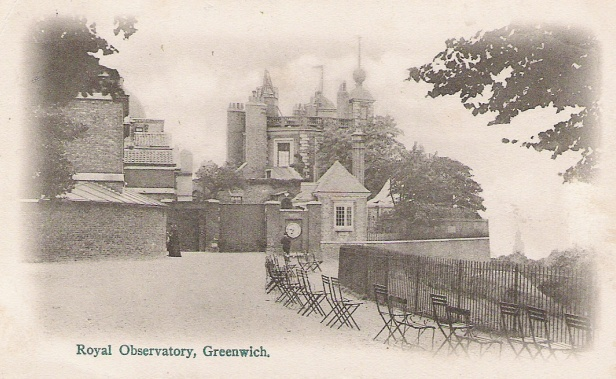
Royal Observatory, Greenwich c. 1902 as depicted on a postcard

Conrad's character Stevie is based on the French anarchist Martial Bourdin who died gruesomely when the explosives he carried detonated prematurely. Bourdin's motives remain a mystery as does his intended target, which may have been the Greenwich Observatory. In the 1920 Author's Note to the novel, Conrad recalls a discussion with Ford Madox Ford about the bombing,

[...] we recalled the already old story of the attempt to blow up the Greenwich Observatory; a blood-stained inanity of so fatuous a kind that it was impossible to fathom its origin by any reasonable or even unreasonable process of thought. For perverse unreason has its own logical processes. But that outrage could not be laid hold of mentally in any sort of way, so that one remained faced by the fact of a man blown to bits for nothing even most remotely resembling an idea, anarchistic or other. As to the outer wall of the Observatory it did not show as much as the faintest crack. I pointed all this out to my friend, who remained silent for a while and then remarked in his characteristically casual and omniscient manner: "Oh, that fellow was half an idiot. His sister committed suicide afterwards." These were absolutely the only words that passed between us [...].

== Major themes ==
=== Terrorism and anarchism ===
Terrorism and anarchism are intrinsic aspects of the novel, and are central to the plot. Verloc is employed by an agency which requires him to orchestrate terrorist activities, and several of the characters deal with terrorism in some way. Verloc's friends are all interested in an anarchistic political revolution, and the police are investigating anarchist motives behind the bombing of Greenwich. The novel was written at a time when terrorist activity was increasing. There had been numerous dynamite attacks in Europe and the US and assassinations of heads of state. Conrad also drew upon two persons, Mikhail Bakunin and Prince Peter Kropotkin. Conrad used these two men in his "portrayal of the novel's anarchists". According to Conrad's Author's Note, only one character was a true anarchist, Winnie Verloc. In The Secret Agent, she is "the only character who performs a serious act of violence against another", despite the F.P.'s intentions of radical change, and The Professor's inclination to keep a bomb on his person.

Critics have analysed the role of terrorism in the novel. Patrick Reilly calls the novel "a terrorist text as well as a text about terrorism" due to Conrad's manipulation of chronology to allow the reader to comprehend the outcome of the bombing before the characters, thereby corrupting the traditional conception of time. Most of Conrad's texts are in non-chronological order, which means that neither terrorism nor anarchism is "a relevant variable for explaining a standard characteristic of Conrad's prose". The morality which is implicit in these acts of terrorism has also been explored, is Verloc evil because his negligence leads to the death of his brother-in-law? Although Winnie evidently thinks so, the issue is not clear, as Verloc attempted to carry out the act with no fatalities, and as simply as possible to retain his job, and care for his family.

=== Politics ===
The role of politics is paramount in the novel, as the main character, Verloc, works for a quasi-political organisation. The role of politics is seen in several places in the novel, in the revolutionary ideas of the F.P.; in the characters' beliefs and in Verloc's private life. Conrad's depiction of anarchism has an "enduring political relevance", although the focus is now largely concerned with the terrorist aspects that this entails. The discussions of the F.P. are expositions on the role of anarchism and its relation to contemporary life. The threat of these thoughts is evident, as Chief Inspector Heat knows F.P. members because of their anarchist views. Michaelis' actions are monitored by the police to such an extent that he must notify the police station that he is moving to the country.

The plot to destroy Greenwich is anarchistic. Vladimir asserts that the bombing "must be purely destructive" and that the anarchists who will be implicated as the architects of the explosion "should make it clear that [they] are perfectly determined to make a clean sweep of the whole social creation". The political form of anarchism is ultimately controlled in the novel, the only supposed politically motivated act is orchestrated by a secret government agency.

Some critics, such as Fredrick R Karl, think that the main political phenomenon in this novel is the modern age, as symbolised by the teeming, pullulating foggy streets of London (most notably in the cab ride taken by Winnie Verloc and Stevie). This modern age distorts everything, including politics (Verloc is motivated by the need to keep his remunerative position, the Professor to some extent by pride); the family (symbolised by the Verloc household, in which all roles are distorted, with the husband being like a father to the wife, who is like a mother to her brother); even the human body (Michaelis and Verloc are hugely obese, while the Professor and Yundt are unusually thin). This extended metaphor, using London as a centre of darkness much like Kurtz's headquarters in Heart of Darkness, presents "a dark vision of moral and spiritual inertia" and a condemnation of those who, like Mrs Verloc, think it a mistake to think too deeply.

== Literary significance and reception ==
The novel fared poorly in the United Kingdom and the United States, selling only 3,076 copies between 1907 and 1914. The book fared slightly better in Britain, yet no more than 6,500 copies were printed before 1914. Although sales increased after 1914, it never sold more than modestly during Conrad's life. It was published to favourable reviews, most agreeing with the view of The Times Literary Supplement that it "increase[d] Conrad's reputation, already of the highest". There were detractors who criticised the novel's "unpleasant characters and subject". Country Life magazine called the story "indecent" and criticised Conrad's "often dense and elliptical style".

The Secret Agent has come to be considered one of Conrad's finest novels. The Independent calls it "[o]ne of Conrad's great city novels" whilst The New York Times insists that it is "the most brilliant novelistic study of terrorism". The Pequod called the book "one of Joseph Conrad's best books," and rated the book a 9.5 out of 10.0." In a 2016 review, The National Review said the book "may be the first great novel of global terrorism."

== Influence on Ted Kaczynski ==
The Secret Agent influenced Ted Kaczynski, also known as the Unabomber. He was a great fan and as an adolescent kept a copy at his bedside. He liked the character of "The Professor" and advised his family to read The Secret Agent to understand the character with whom he felt such an affinity. Don Foster, the literary attributionist who assisted the FBI, said that Kaczynski "seem[ed] to have felt that his family could not understand him without reading Conrad".

Kaczynski's idolisation of the character was due to the personality traits that they shared, disaffection, hostility toward the world, and being an aspiring anarchist. However, it did not stop at mere idolisation. Kaczynski used "The Professor" as a source of inspiration, and "fabricated sixteen exploding packages that detonated in various locations". After his capture, Kaczynski revealed to FBI agents that he had read the novel a dozen times, and had sometimes used "Conrad" as an alias. It was discovered that Kaczynski had used various formulations of Conrad's name – Conrad, Konrad, and Korzeniowski, Conrad's original surname – to sign himself into several hotels in Sacramento. As in his youth, Kaczynski retained a copy of The Secret Agent, and kept it with him while living as a recluse in a hut in Montana.

== Adaptations ==
=== Film ===
- 1936, UK, retitled Sabotage, directed by Alfred Hitchcock, starring Oscar Homolka, Sylvia Sidney and John Loder. This version departs considerably from the novel.
- 1996, The Secret Agent, UK film starring Bob Hoskins, Patricia Arquette, Gérard Depardieu, Robin Williams and Christian Bale.
- Lone Wolf (2021), Australian film starring Tilda Cobham-Hervey, Josh McConville, Lawrence Mooney and Hugo Weaving. Set in the near future in Australia instead of London in the early 1900s.

=== Television ===
- 1957, Canada, part of the Folio anthology series.
- 1957, UK, part of the ITV Play of the Week anthology series.
- 1959, Canada, part of the Ford Startime anthology series.
- 1967, UK BBC, in two episodes.
- 1975, UK BBC.
- 1981, France, L'agent secret, part of Le roman du samedi (The Saturday Novel) anthology series.
- 1992, UK BBC miniseries in three episodes, starring David Suchet and Peter Capaldi.
- 2001, UK 50-minute adaptation aired on the short-lived TV channel BBC Knowledge.
- 2016, UK BBC miniseries in four episodes, starring Toby Jones and Vicky McClure.

Various scenes from the novel were also dramatised in Joseph Conrad's The Secret Agent (1987), a 60-minute UK documentary featuring Frances Barber, Hywel Bennett, Jim Broadbent and Brian Glover.

=== Radio ===
- 1951, adapted by Felix Felton and produced by Frank Hauser.
- 1953, adapted by Felix Felton and produced by Martyn C. Webster. Part of the Saturday Night Theatre series.
- 1967, in two episodes, adapted by Alexander Baron and produced by David Conroy.
- 1975, in two episodes, produced by Rosemary Hill.
- 1978, in 14 episodes, abridged and read by Gavin Campbell. Part of the Book at Bedtime series.
- 1984, in 14 episodes, abridged by Jacek Laskowski and directed by Richard Imison.
- 2006, in two episodes, abridged by David Napthine, produced and directed by Jessica Dromgoole. Part of the Classic Serial series.

Audible audiobooks have produced at least 13 different unabridged readings of the novel, including in French, German and Spanish.

=== Opera ===
Conrad's novel has been adapted as operas by Simon Wills (2006), Michael Dellaira (2011), and Allen Reichman and Curtis Bryant (2013).

== Bibliography ==
- Caplan, Carola M; Mallios, Peter Lancelot; White, Andrea, eds. (2004), Conrad in the Twentieth Century: Contemporary Approaches and Perspectives, Abingdon, Oxford: Routledge, ISBN 0-415-97164-0.
- Conrad, Joseph (1969), The Secret Agent, Penguin.
- ——— (1990). Seymour-Smith, Martin (ed.). The Secret Agent. London: Penguin. ISBN 0-14-018096-6..
- ——— (1994), The Secret Agent, London: Penguin, ISBN 0-14-062056-7.
- ——— (2004), Lyon, John (ed.), The Secret Agent: A Simple Tale, Oxford: Oxford University Press, ISBN 0-19-280169-4.
- Houen, Alex (2002), Terrorism and Modern Literature: From Joseph Conrad to Ciaran Carson, Oxford: Oxford University Press, ISBN 0-19-818770-X.
- Lawrence, John Shelton; Jewett, Robert (2002), The Myth of the American Superhero, Grand Rapids, MI, US: Eerdmans, ISBN 0-8028-2573-7.
- Melchiori, Barbara Arnett (1985), Terrorism in the Late Victorian Novel, London: Croom Helm.
- Orr, Leonard; Billy, Ted; Billy, Theodore (1999), A Joseph Conrad Companion, New Haven, CT, US: Greenwood, ISBN 0-313-29289-2.
- Oswell, Douglas Evander (2007), The Unabomber and the Zodiac, Lulu, ISBN 978-0-615-14569-3.
- Paulson, Ronald (2007), Sin and Evil: Moral Values in Literature, New Haven, US: Yale University Press.
- Reilly, Patrick (2003), The Dark Landscape of Modern Fiction, London: Ashgate, ISBN 0-7546-3370-5.
- Simmons, Allan H; Stape, JH (2007), The Secret Agent: Centennial Essays, Amsterdam: Rodopi, ISBN 978-90-420-2176-1.
- Woodard, J David (2006), The America that Reagan Built, New Haven, CT, US: Greenwood, ISBN 0-275-98609-8.
