= An Outcast of the Islands =

1896 novel by Joseph Conrad

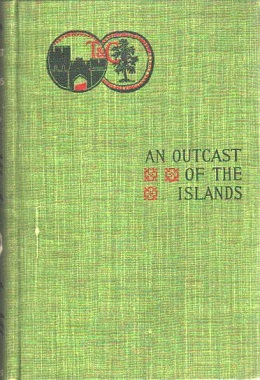
First US edition (publ. D. Appleton and Company)

An Outcast of the Islands is the second novel by Joseph Conrad, published in 1896, inspired by Conrad's experience as mate of a steamer, the Vidar.

The novel details the undoing of Peter Willems, a disreputable, immoral man who, on the run from a scandal in Makassar, finds refuge in a hidden native village, only to betray his benefactors over lust for the tribal chief's daughter. The story features Conrad's recurring character Tom Lingard, who also appears in Almayer's Folly (1895) and The Rescue (1920), in addition to sharing other characters with those novels. It is considered by many to be underrated as a work of literature. Conrad romanticizes the jungle environment and its inhabitants in a similar style to that of his Heart of Darkness.

This novel was adapted into the film Outcast of the Islands in 1951 by director Carol Reed, featuring Trevor Howard as Willems, Ralph Richardson as Lingard, Robert Morley, and Wendy Hiller.

The work was quoted in T. S. Eliot's The Hollow Men ('Life is very long.').
