= 'Twixt Land and Sea =

1912 short story collection by Joseph Conrad

- First edition cover
- Author: Joseph Conrad
- Language: English
- Genre: Short Stories
- Publisher: J. M. Dent and Sons
- Publication date: 1912
- Publication place: United Kingdom
- Media type: Print (hardcover)
- Pages: 264
- OCLC: 2351239

'Twixt Land and Sea is a collection of three works of short fiction by Joseph Conrad published in 1912 by J. M. Dent publishers.

== Stories ==
The three works in 'Twixt Land and Sea first appeared in literary journals; the publisher and date are provided below.

"A Smile of Fortune" (London Magazine, February 1911)
"The Secret Sharer" (Harper's Magazine, August–September 1910)
"Freya of the Seven Isles" (The Metropolitan Magazine, April 1912, The London Magazine, July 1912)

== Background ==
In 1909 Conrad received an unexpected visit from Captain C. M. Marris, a seafarer he had served with as a youth in the Malay Archipelago. The captain informed Conrad that many of his old colleagues were avid readers of his literary fiction. Though he had not written a short story for years, Conrad was inspired to write the works that would be collected in 'Twixt Land and Sea.

Conrad wrote to his literary agent J. B. Pinker on Marris' visit in October 1909:

It was like the raising of a lot of dead—dead to me, because most of them live out there and even read my books...And the best of it is that all these men of 22 years ago feel kindly to the Chronicler of their lives and adventures. They shall have some more of the stories they like.

Conrad dedicated 'Twixt Land and Sea to Captain Marris.

== Sources ==
- Baines, Jocelyn. 1960. Joseph Conrad: A Critical Biography, McGraw-Hill Book Company, New York. ISBN 978-0297167556
- Graver, Laurence. 1969. Conrad's Short Fiction. University of California Press, Berkeley, California. ISBN 0-520-00513-9
