= Amy Foster (short story) =

- Short story by Joseph Conrad
- Country: United Kingdom
- Language: English

Publication
- Published in: The Illustrated London News
- Publication date: December 1901

"Amy Foster" is a short story by Joseph Conrad written in 1901, first published in The Illustrated London News (December 1901), and collected in Typhoon and Other Stories (1903).

== Plot ==
A poor emigrant from Central Europe sailing from Hamburg to America is shipwrecked off the coast of England. The residents of nearby villages, at first unaware of the sinking, and hence of the possibility of survivors, regard him as a dangerous tramp and madman. He speaks no English; his strange foreign language frightens them, and they offer him no assistance.

Eventually "Yanko Goorall" (as rendered in English spelling) is given shelter and employment by an eccentric old local, Mr. Swaffer. Yanko learns a little English. He explains that his given name Yanko means "little John" and that he was a mountaineer (a resident of a mountain area — a Goorall), hence his surname. (Note: Though the story does not explicitly mention Yanko being a Pole or speaking Polish, the surname "Goorall" clearly alludes to the Polish Górale. Thus Yanko's actual Polish name would have been Janko Góral.) The story's narrator reveals that Yanko hailed from the Carpathian Mountains.

Yanko falls in love with Amy Foster, a servant girl who has shown him some kindness. To the community's disapproval, they marry. The couple live in a cottage given to Yanko by Swaffer for having saved his granddaughter's life. Yanko and Amy have a son whom Amy calls Johnny (after Little John). Amy, a simple woman, is troubled by Yanko's behavior, particularly his trying to teach their son to pray with him in his "disturbing" language.

Several months later Yanko falls severely ill and, suffering from a fever, begins raving in his native language. Amy, frightened, takes their child and flees for her life. Next morning Yanko dies of heart failure. It transpires that he had simply been asking in his native language for water.

== Interpretation ==
Yanko Goorall shares similarities with Conrad himself. Like Yanko, Conrad is a foreigner living in England, far from his native land; the pivotal scene of Amy being scared by the fevered Yanko is based on an incident during Conrad's 1896 honeymoon in France when, in a fevered delirium, he reverted to his native Polish, frightening his wife Jessie.

As noted by Zdzisław Najder and Ford himself, "Amy Foster" was inspired partly by an anecdote in Ford Madox Ford's The Cinque Ports (1900), wherein a shipwrecked sailor from a German merchant ship, unable to communicate in English, and driven away by the local country people, finally found shelter in a pigsty.

"Amy Foster" is believed to reflect Conrad's own social alienation in English society. Edward Said has remarked that "It is difficult to read ‘Amy Foster’ without thinking that Conrad must have feared dying a similar death, inconsolable, alone, talking away in a language no one could understand".

In 1997, "Amy Foster" was made into the film, Swept from the Sea.
