= Youth, A Narrative; and Two Other Stories =

Youth, a Narrative; and Two Other Stories
- First edition cover
- Author: Joseph Conrad
- Language: English
- Genre: Short Stories
- Publisher: William Blackwood and Sons
- Publication date: 1902
- Publication place: United States
- Media type: Print (hardcover)
- Pages: 375
- OCLC: 557007

Youth, a Narrative; and Two Other Stories is a collection of three works of short fiction by Joseph Conrad, originally serialized in Blackwood’s Magazine. The volume was published in 1902 by William Blackwood and Sons.

The collection includes the novella "Heart of Darkness", considered one of the finest examples of modern fiction. The stories introduced the character Charles Marlow.

== Stories ==
The three stories that appear in Youth, a Narrative were serialized in Blackwood's Magazine previous to their collection. The month and date of their first serialization appears below after the title.

“Youth” (September, 1898)
“Heart of Darkness” (February–April, 1899)
“The End of the Tether” (July–September, 1902)

It was originally intended to be published in a Marlow trilogy, consisting of Youth, Heart of Darkness, and Lord Jim.

== Publication Background ==
After the success of the short story “Youth” in 1898, publisher William Blackwood offered to include the story in a collection if Conrad could publish two more works. Conrad consented and these stories were the material for this, his second volume of short fiction.

== Sources ==
- Baines, Jocelyn. 1960. Joseph Conrad: A Critical Biography, McGraw-Hill Book Company, New York. ISBN 978-0297167556
- Graver, Laurence. 1969. Conrad’s Short Fiction. University of California Press, Berkeley, California. ISBN 0-520-00513-9
- Watt, Ian. 1977. Impressionism and Symbolism in Heart of Darkness. The Southern Review, January 1977 in Joseph Conrad: Modern Critical Reviews, editor Harold Bloom. Chelsea House Publishers. 1987 pp. 83–99 ISBN 0-87754-642-8
