= Chance (Conrad novel) =

1913 novel by Joseph Conrad

First UK edition (pub. Methuen & Co.)

Chance is a novel by Joseph Conrad, published in 1913, following serial publication the previous year. Although the novel was not one upon which Conrad's later critical reputation was to depend, it was his greatest commercial success upon initial publication.

Chance is narrated by Conrad's regular narrator, Charles Marlow, along with other narrators, who take up the complex narrative at different points. The novel is also unusual among its author's works for such strong emphasis on a female character: the heroine, Flora de Barral.

The narrators attempt to interpret various episodes in the life of Miss de Barral, the daughter of a convicted swindler named Smith de Barral. Miss de Barral leads a sheltered life for as long as her father is prosperous, but at other times must rely on the generosity of others, who resent her or have agendas for her, before she escapes by marrying one Captain Anthony. Much of the book involves the musing of the various narrators over what she and the Captain expected from this union, and what they actually got from it. When her father is released from prison, he joins them on the ship, and the book heads towards its denouement. Breaking away from tradition, Chance deals with social issues surrounding feminism and financial speculation, involving Mrs. Fyne and Flora de Barral, as presented by the various narrators. The storyline oscillates between human will and purposeful activity and an opposing "apathetic" force which nullifies the importance of human action.

== Reception ==
Chance opened a path to commercial success for Conrad after years of slow progress and obscurity. This success could be measured by the record sales of the book in 1914, which outsold all his previous publications and shot him to fame. The complex style of Conrad's narrative in this novel invited widespread criticisms from peers and readers alike.
