= Charles Marlow =

- First appearance: Heart of Darkness
- Created by: Joseph Conrad
- Portrayed by: Roddy McDowell; Martin Sheen; Tim Roth; Jack Hawkins; Noah Beery; Piotr Fronczewski; Kévin Azaïs; Guy Nadon; James McAvoy; Richard Carlson

In-universe information
- Nickname: Captain Marlow
- Gender: Male
- Occupation: Seaman in the Merchant Marine
- Nationality: English

Charles Marlow is a fictional English seaman and recurring character in the work of novelist Joseph Conrad.

== Role of Marlow in novels by Conrad ==
Marlow narrates several of Conrad's best-known works such as the novels Lord Jim (1900) and Chance (1913), as well as the framed narrative in Heart of Darkness (1899), and his short story "Youth" (1898). In Lord Jim, Marlow narrates but has a role in the story, finding a place for Jim to live, twice. Raymond Malbone considers that Marlow is the main character in Lord Jim, as "the theme of the novel rests in what Jim's story means to Marlow rather than in what happens to Jim."

The stories are not told entirely from Marlow's perspective, however. There is also an omniscient narrator who introduces Marlow and some of the other characters. Once introduced, Marlow then proceeds to tell the main tale, creating a story-within-a-story effect.

In Heart of Darkness the omniscient narrator observes that "yarns of seamen have a direct simplicity, the whole meaning of which lies within the shell of a cracked nut. But Marlow was not typical [...] and to him the meaning of an episode was not inside like a kernel but outside, enveloping the tale which brought it out only as a glow brings out a haze, in the likeness of one of those misty halos that sometimes are made visible by the spectral illumination of moonshine."

== Inspiration ==
Marlow's name may be inspired by the Elizabethan playwright Christopher Marlowe. Conrad's father was a translator of William Shakespeare who doubtless would have known of Marlowe's work as well. Some intertextual interpretations of Heart of Darkness have suggested that Marlowe's The Tragical History of Doctor Faustus may have influenced Conrad. Charles Marlow describes a character as a "papier-mâché Mephistopheles", a reference to the Faust legend. Marlow's and Kurtz's journey up the Congo River in Heart of Darkness also has similarities to another work by Marlowe, Dido, Queen of Carthage, in which Aeneas is stranded on the shore of Libya and meets the African queen Dido.

== Other sources ==
- Stape, John Henry (1996), The Cambridge Companion to Joseph Conrad, Cambridge: Cambridge University Press, ISBN 0-521-48484-7
- Wake, Paul (2007), Conrad's Marlow: Narrative and Death in 'Youth', Heart of Darkness, Lord Jim and Chance, Manchester: Manchester University Press, ISBN 978-1784992477
