= Typhoon (novella) =

1902 novella by Joseph Conrad

- First book edition (US)
- Author: Joseph Conrad
- Language: English
- Genre: Adventure story
- Publisher: Pall Mall Magazine
- Publication date: 1902
- Publication place: United Kingdom
- Media type: Print (hardback & paperback)
- OCLC: 2312277

Typhoon is a novella by Joseph Conrad, begun in 1899 and serialised in Pall Mall Magazine in January–March 1902. Its first book publication was in New York by Putnam in 1902; it was also published in Britain in Typhoon and Other Stories by Heinemann in 1903.

== Plot summary ==
Captain MacWhirr sails the Nan-Shan, a British-built steamer running under the Siamese flag, into a typhoon—a mature tropical cyclone of the northwestern part of the Pacific Ocean. Other characters include the young Jukes—most probably an alter ego of Conrad from the time he had sailed under captain John McWhir—and Solomon Rout, the chief engineer. While MacWhirr, who, according to Conrad, "never walked on this Earth"—is emotionally estranged from his family and crew, and though he refuses to consider an alternative course to skirt the typhoon, his indomitable will in the face of a superior natural force elicits grudging admiration.

== Analysis ==
Conrad "broke new ground" by showing the ways a steam ship differs from a sailing vessel, an historic shift occurring at the time: for example how the crew are broken into "sailors and firemen [engineers]"; the unromantic labours of Hackett and Beal; and the captain as a mirror of his ship, isolated from nature and lacking the power of imagination.

Stylistically, Conrad made "perhaps the most celebrated ellipsis in modern short fiction". At the end of chapter V the story reaches a climactic point, when the ship barely makes it into the eye of the typhoon and faces a final challenge to exit the storm through the eye wall:

The hurricane, with its power to madden the seas, to sink ships, to uproot trees, to overturn strong walls and dash the very birds of the air to the ground, had found this taciturn man in its path, and, doing its utmost, had managed to wring out a few words. Before the renewed wrath of winds swooped on his ship, Captain MacWhirr was moved to declare, in a tone of vexation, as it were: “I wouldn't like to lose her.”

This is followed by a single sentence:

He was spared that annoyance.

The story then leaps forward in time with the ship back in port, the events unstated of how this happened. This was an innovative technique with hints of post-modernism: Conrad challenges the reader to fill in the events of the story themselves. The break in the chronology is particularly effective, and jarring, as the preceding passages had been so detailed that the time it took to read the novella and the real time of the story were not so different.

== Real life connections ==
In 1887, Conrad worked as chief mate on the Highland Forest under Captain John McWhir, whom he portrays in the novel as "McWhirr". He drew upon this six months' voyage for the novel.

Conrad once dictated to biographer and friend Richard Curle a list of ships he had served on, and the stories they were connected to. The connections might have been minor (a single character or incident) or major (a complete voyage), but Conrad did not indicate which. For Typhoon, he said it "suggested" the steamer John P. Best which he had served on.

Joseph Conrad dedicated the book to Cunninghame Graham, a fellow writer and Scots radical who was an enthusiastic supporter of Conrad from his earliest publications.

== Characters ==
- Captain Tom MacWhirr, an empirical man without imagination.
- Jukes, the first mate. Typhoon alternates between his third-person limited point of view, the third-person limited point of view of MacWhirr, and the third-person omniscient point of view of the narrator.
- Jukes's absent friend, the second mate from a trans-Atlantic liner. The omniscient narrator quotes from Jukes's letters to him, and the friend comments to his shipmates about a letter from Jukes.
- Solomon Rout, the chief engineer, an experienced seaman.
- The garrulous, choleric second engineer Harry and the silent third engineer Beale.
- The boatswain, "an ill-favoured, undersized, gruff sailor of fifty, coarsely hairy, short-legged, long-armed, resembing an elderly ape."
- The second mate: "He was one of those men who...are competent enough, appear hopelessly hard up, show no evidence of any kind of vice, and carry about with them all the signs of manifest failure."
- The other sailors, steward and cook of the Nan-Shan. The reader only learns the name of the helmsman, Hackett.
- The coolies, hired workers being sent home to China by the Bun Hin Company.
- The clerk for the Bun Hin Company, who interprets between the workers and the ship's officers.
- Mrs. Lucy MacWhirr, Lydia, and Tom, the Captain's wife, daughter and son, who all comment upon him in one way or another from their home in London.
- Mrs. Rout, the chief engineer's wife and the elder Mrs. Rout, the chief engineer's mother, also living in London, who comment upon the engineer.
- The two owners of the shipbuilding firm in Dumbarton, Scotland, that constructed the Nan-Shan. They discuss MacWhirr after hiring and briefing him.
