= List of Endeavour characters =

This article is a list of characters appearing in Endeavour, the ITV prequel crime drama, broadcast from 2 January 2012 to 12 March 2023.

== Oxford City Police CID, Cowley Station ==
=== Detective Constable (DC) Endeavour Morse ===
==== Background and personality ====
The protagonist and main character of the series. Endeavour Morse, played by Shaun Evans, is a twenty-eight-year-old Detective Constable in the Oxford City Police's CID at Cowley Police Station, Oxford. Endeavour grew up in Lincolnshire. His father was a taxi driver and his mother, Constance, died when Endeavour was twelve years old in 1950 when she was twenty nine. His father married a woman named Gwen, whose daughter Joyce "Joycie" is Endeavour's step-sister. Endeavour left Lonsdale College at Oxford University late in his third year without taking a degree as a result of breaking up with a woman from Jericho named Susan. Endeavour spent a short time in the Royal Corps of Signals as a cipher clerk before joining the Carshall-Newtown Police. After spending two years as a Police Constable, Endeavour is transferred to CID as a Detective Constable.

In the pilot episode of the series, Morse transfers to the Oxford City Police's CID in 1965 following the coaxing of the Oxford City Police's Cowley Station "guv", veteran DI Fred Thursday, after the young Endeavour successfully solves a double murder case. Throughout the series, Endeavour expresses doubts in staying with the police, and in the Series 2 finale, expresses a desire to possibly leave the force and become a teacher abroad.

Endeavour is highly intelligent and possesses a wealth of knowledge on Oxford and English history, opera and classical music. His favourite opera singer is Rosalind Calloway, a killer whom he helped capture and who ultimately took her own life in the pilot episode. A non-smoker, Morse initially was a teetotaler, before being given a pint of ale by Thursday following his fainting at the sight of an autopsy. By the second series, Morse increased his level of alcohol consumption, particularly in spirits. Morse does not believe in an afterlife. In the episode "Nocturne", he discusses his belief that "death is the end", because he "saw enough of it."

==== Series 1 ====
While with the Oxford City Police, Morse is taken under the wing of veteran Inspector Thursday. Thursday names Endeavour his designated "bag man" and shows him the ropes as Morse begins to solve a string of complex murders, much to the envy and annoyance of some of his superiors, particularly Detective Sergeant Peter Jakes and Police Chief Superintendent Reginald Bright. Thursday and Morse's fellow officer, Police Constable Strange, try to steer the young Endeavour into taking his Sergeant's exam, so that he may be relieved of "General Duties" and become Thursday's official "bag man" with the appropriate rank and title of a Sergeant. In the final episode of Series 1, Morse is shot during an investigation, around the same time that his father dies. Morse is then put on "light duty" for several months at Oxfordshire (County) Police's Witney Station, under D.I. Bart Church.

==== Series 2 ====
Upon returning to Cowley Station in 1966, Morse is received warmly by Chief Superintendent Bright and Sergeant Jakes, as Inspector Thursday begins to keep a more watchful eye on the young Endeavour. As a result of the shooting, Morse begins to suffer from delayed stress and paranoia, as well as an increase in alcohol consumption at local pubs and in his own city flat. Upon return to active duty, Morse is confronted first by three cases, which he tries to tie in together. Morse makes several mistakes in the investigation, but despite his errors, he solves the cases, impressing his superiors. During the investigation of one case, he is beaten into a concussion and is cared for by his nurse neighbour, Monica Hicks, who becomes his love interest during Series 2. D.I. Thursday's daughter, Joan, begins to take a romantic interest in Endeavour, although unrequited.

Morse solves several more complex murder cases and in the series finale, Morse and Thursday are called upon by Assistant Chief Constable Deare to investigate corruption within the Oxford City and Oxfordshire Police forces. After investigating several cases leading to the pillars of Oxford society, the finale of Series 2 ends with Thursday's being shot by ACC Deare, who is in fact the head of the corruption, who succeeds in framing Endeavour for his murder of the Chief Constable and the bilking of evidence. Morse is arrested and placed in a jail cell.

==== Series 4 ====
In the first episode Morse learns that he has failed his sergeant exams because his papers went missing. Chief Bright suggests that some of Morse’s enemies might be sabotaging his career and advises him to leave Oxford. Morse, however, decides to stay. After having received a call from her, Morse locates Joan in Leamington and asks her to come home which she refuses. In the final episode Morse receives a job offer in London and he considers leaving Oxford. Joan visits Morse when she is hit and kicked out by her boyfriend. He asks her to marry him, which she refuses, and he gives her some money to help her out. Later, Morse is notified when Joan is admitted to hospital following a miscarriage. Having averted a disaster at a nuclear power plant along with Thursday, Morse is awarded the George Medal and promoted detective sergeant in the series finale.

=== Detective Inspector (DI) Frederick Albert Thursday ===
==== Background and personality ====
Fred Thursday is a veteran Detective Inspector and Second World War veteran portrayed by Roger Allam. Thursday served in the North African and Italian Campaigns during the war as a soldier in the British Expeditionary Force after becoming a policeman in London in December 1938. Thursday married his wife, Win, in November 1941, with whom he has two children in their early twenties: Joan and Sam. Thursday is one of the more noble and honourable figures in the series and takes the young Endeavour under his wing, clearly seeing Endeavour's high level of intelligence when it comes to police work. Thursday also keeps Endeavour in line and tries to protect him. Thursday is also highly protective of his family and always avoids corruption and does his best to do what is right and decent. Thursday never talks about his work at home with his family, preferring to "leave work...on the hall stand by the front door".

In the pilot episode, after seeing to the removal of a corrupt Detective Sergeant, Thursday persuades young Endeavour Morse to transfer out of the Carshall-Newtown Police and join the Oxford City Police, saying that "The world is long on academics, Morse, but we're short a good detective".

In the original script for the pilot, the character was called DI Bernard Stokes.

==== Series 1 ====
In the first series, Thursday names Morse his designated "bag man", much to the chagrin of DS Jakes and to the annoyance of the very procedural CS Bright. In the second episode, Thursday tries to get Morse to accept "General Duties" until he can pass his sergeants exam and be given more leeway, explaining to Morse that he needs more experience by saying he was a good detective, "...but a poor policeman. No one can teach you the first, but any fool can learn the second". Still, Thursday tries to convince CS Bright of Morse's obvious intelligence and superiority to make his superiors more accepting of the young Endeavour. In the series finale, it is revealed that Thursday was originally an officer in the Metropolitan Police Service in London during the earlier half of his career, but relocated himself and his family to Oxford and transferred to the Oxford City Police after an officer working under his wing in London was killed in a beating gone too far by East London gangsters, aiming to take revenge upon Thursday. Thursday then saves Morse's life by shooting and killing a murderer who shot Morse.

==== Series 2 ====
In the second series, Thursday displays more of a fatherly role toward Morse and explains his worry for the young detective to his wife, Winifred 'Win', particularly when Morse begins to show signs of delayed stress and increased alcohol consumption. Thursday and Morse solve several complex cases together. In the third episode, it is revealed that shortly after he was married, during the Italian Campaign of WWII, Thursday had a love affair with a young Italian woman who he thought was murdered by the Nazis. When she surfaces as a department store clerk in Oxford, Thursday begins seeing the woman again, but does not engage in any impropriety. The woman kills herself due to grief in betraying her family during the war, which crushes Thursday who still loved her despite being married.

In the Series 2 finale, Morse and Thursday are called upon by ACC Deare to investigate rampant corruption within the Oxford City Police, the Oxfordshire (County) Police, and the Town Hall. At the same time, as part of streamlining in the Thames Valley Police merger, Bright suggests that Thursday either retires or becomes a Training Officer, in part due to his age and high blood pressure. Thursday mulls the idea over. Finally, in a set up headed by ACC Deare, the head of the corruption, Thursday is shot in the chest trying to rescue a young boy who witnessed a murder and was ultimately kidnapped by corrupt officers. Thursday's last few lines include his affirmation that it is not about him, but about the people he is sworn to protect and serve. Thursday ends his affirmation before being shot by saying to Morse, "I was born a copper, and I'll die one." Morse administers to the critically wounded Thursday until an ambulance arrives. The episode ends with Thursday's family waiting in their home for the phone to ring, bringing news of Thursday's condition. The finale ends with no news as to Thursday's condition, which appears grave, or as to whether or not he lives or dies.

==== Series 3 ====
In the third series, it is shown Thursday has survived his ordeal, though it has adversely affected both his physical and mental health. He successfully encourages Morse to return to Oxford City Police following Morse's incarceration.

==== Series 4 ====
In season 4, Thursday is dealing with his daughter Joan's departure and his wife's subsequent depression. When Bright is taken ill, Thursday acts up as senior officer of the station, but does not enjoy administrative or political tasks, and is relieved when Bright returns. In S4E4 "Harvest", Thursday receives the George Medal for gallantry and is promoted to Detective Chief Inspector.

=== Detective Sergeant (DS) Peter Jakes ===
==== Background and personality ====
Peter Jakes is the Detective Sergeant working under Fred Thursday and is played by Jack Laskey. Jakes works diligently as a policeman, trying to earn his keep and impress Thursday. However, Jakes can be seen as somewhat unscrupulous and vindictive and often puts up a front of bravado to try and impress his superiors and women at the local pubs with his exploits.

==== Series 1 ====
Jakes is on-and-off the antagonist of the first series, displaying jealousy, anger, and contempt toward Endeavour, who although a lower rank than Jakes, is picked by Thursday to be his "bag man". Jakes and Morse clash on many occasions during the first series. In the final episode of Series 1, Jakes takes Thursday's daughter Joan out dancing and attempts to fondle her on the dance floor, at which time Joan refuses and Jakes quickly leaves at the sight of Thursday entering the club. In exchange for not telling Thursday about his date with Joan, Jakes proposes helping Morse cheat on the upcoming sergeant's exam.

==== Series 2 ====
In the second series, after Morse returns to active duty following his being shot, Jakes seems to no longer be jealous toward Morse and no longer picks on him, believing him to have earned his keep. Instead the two work together and Morse respects Jakes' rank. In the Series 2 finale, it is revealed that in the mid-1950s as a child, Jakes stayed at a home for wayward boys in Kidlington called Blenheim Vale, where he was nicknamed "Little Pete" by the other boys. Only staying a short time, Jakes was one of many boys who were the victims of sexual and physical assault by the "guv" of Blenheim Vale (now Alderman Wintergreen), a young Oxfordshire police officer (now Assistant Chief Constable Deare), and several other adult men in charge of the home. As a result of this background, Jakes has a breakdown and drinks himself into a stupor at the end of the episode.

==== Series 3 ====
At the beginning of Series 3, Morse's sabbatical means that Jakes is working more closely with DI Thursday. When Morse returns, it is apparent that Jakes considers Morse an equal and a friend, although he still good-naturedly pulls rank on Morse during their rescue of a kidnap victim in episode two. Jakes leaves at the end of the episode, as he is emigrating to the USA with his girlfriend, a doctoral student from Wyoming, who is expecting a baby. Morse gives him a parting gift of premium bonds "for the child".

In the original script for the pilot, the character was called DS Kevin Ames.

== Oxford City Police, Cowley Station ==
=== Chief Superintendent (CS) Reginald Bright ===
Reginald "Reggie" Bright is the Police Chief Superintendent, or head of the Oxford City Police's Cowley Station, who reports to the Assistant Chief Constable and the Chief Constable of the Oxford City Police. He is portrayed by Anton Lesser. Russell Lewis, creator of the series, said:

Bright has come – as I think is alluded to in some of his dialogue – from the Colonial Police, and has spent most of his career ‘overseas’. I think that dictates in some part his attitude to the men. He is still applying the lessons learnt in the tropics – a certain ‘Empire’ way of dealing with ‘local officers’ and indigenous peoples – to the good folk of Oxford. His is a world – his younger days at least – straight out of John Betjeman's A Subaltern's Love Song. ‘Six o’clock news... lime juice and gin.’ The second son. Packed off to ‘foreign climes’ to make his way in the world, and do his bit for King and Country. He is a man even more out of time than most in the 1960s. But, he is a very decent man, if a little dazzled by those he perceives as his social betters. When the chips are down, his loyalty to his troops – for all his bark and bite – is total.

Bright is somewhat oblivious and is considered to be an "old school" police officer, very worried about appearances and courtesies when dealing with rank, royalty or the Oxford elite, and at first, like Sgt. Jakes, is jealous and very contemptuous toward Morse, despite the young detective's obvious intelligence. Bright suggests to Thursday that it is bad practice to enlist a DC as his bagman, but soon comes to better appreciate young Endeavour by the second series, after he returns from being shot and solving several complex cases.

As the series progresses, he slowly becomes a more sympathetic character; he is exceedingly protective of WPC Trewlove, for whom he has a soft spot and shows immense bravery when the situation calls for it, challenging the initial image of his being weak-willed and sycophantic. His quiet courage and clear dedication to justice gradually helps to ease his and Morse's relationship onto a friendlier footing, with the two men slowly becoming respected colleagues and equals. He is also a devoted husband to his wife, Carrie, whom he mentions often and who makes an appearance in Series 6. He and Thursday, as the two senior members of the Cowley team, are often seen contemplating the changes of the world and the impact it has on their profession as policemen.

In the original script for the pilot, the character was called Chief Superintendent Rupert Cavendish.

=== Police Constable (PC) James "Jim" Strange ===
Constable Strange is one of many police constables in the Oxford City Police and is portrayed by Sean Rigby. Morse and Strange meet in Series 1 episode 'Girl' and immediately become friends, with Strange one of the few to take the time to truly get to know Morse and gaining a better understanding of his character. At the end of series 1, Strange takes the police exam to become a sergeant in Morse's place, but at the beginning of series 2 it is revealed that he failed. As a PC, he partakes in a great deal of legwork on the streets and is shown to keep his head in a crisis, taking command of a situation quickly and efficiently. In series 2, Strange is invited to become a freemason, and accepts, despite Morse's disapproval.

At the beginning of series 3, Strange is promoted to sergeant, and in the third episode he moves from uniform to CID, replacing DS Jakes as Morse's immediate superior. This puts a strain on their friendship and a clash at the end of Series 3 when Strange reiterates his authority over his and Morse's contrasting methods of policing. However, the two remain on the same side; they work together on a more even keel during Series 4 and in Series 6 and after the closure of Cowley Station, Strange falsely claims Morse to be a brother Freemason in order to get him transferred back to CID.

=== Woman Police Constable (WPC) Shirley Trewlove ===
W.P.C. Trewlove, played by Dakota Blue Richards, joins the Oxford City Police at the Cowley Police Station in Series 3, Episode 2. She is an efficient and effective investigator and swiftly gains Morse's praise in her diligence and abilities. Chief Superintendent Bright sees her as an attractive addition to the station and proves to be exceedingly protective of her; for her part, she becomes extremely fond of him in turn. A woman in police work was novel in the 1960s. Constable Trewlove is sometimes treated in a condescending manner by detectives as well as suspects. Morse, Strange, Thursday, and Bright step to her defense, particularly following a confrontation with a sexist, misogynist Box.

In a similar manner to Joan Thursday, Shirley Trewlove develops a distant yet romantic fondness for Morse which he also fails to openly reciprocate. Perhaps out of a sense of propriety of not jeopardizing his work or reputation at work. In Series 5 she quietly starts to see D.C. George Fancy, and their growing relationship is observed by Morse. He seems to believe she is worthy of a more sophisticated partner. Trewlove is obviously deeply affected at the end of the series when D.C. Fancy dies in gang-war crossfire. She leaves for a new position at Scotland Yard. At her departure she tells Morse to 'make the most of life'.

== Thursday's Family ==
=== Joan Thursday ===
Joan Thursday is Inspector Thursday's daughter. She is in her early to mid-twenties and works at a bank in Oxford. She is portrayed by Sara Vickers.

In the original script for the pilot, the character was originally called Jackie Stokes.

==== Series 1 ====
Joan is introduced in the second episode of Series 1 and in the final episode of Series 1, goes out on a date with DS Jakes, who takes her to the Moonlight Rooms nightclub in Oxford. While dancing, Jakes fondles Joan, who brushes him off and is escorted home by Morse.

==== Series 2 ====
Beginning in Series 2, upon his return to the Oxford City Police following several months of light duty, Joan begins taking a romantic interest in the young Endeavour. However, her interest is not openly reciprocated. Morse works hand-in-glove with her father and may therefore be guarded about moving forward with her.

==== Series 3 ====
Joan appears sporadically throughout Series 3, although her relationship with Morse is cheerful. In the Series 3 finale, the bank where Joan works is robbed and she is taken hostage, along with the other employees and Morse, who comforts her during the saga and supports her through it, the two of them glad of each other's company during the ordeal. When she tries to save Morse from the robbers, one of her colleagues is shot and dies for which Joan blames herself in the aftermath. Subsequently, she decides to leave Oxford, just as Morse recognises the depth of his feelings for her. On running to meet Joan, he finds her ready to depart and despite his attempt to confess his love for her, leaves it unspoken and decides to let her go. The two share a moment of what could have been before Joan heads to the train-station, leaving her family devastated and a wedge between Thursday and Morse as a consequence of her departure.

==== Series 4 ====
In "Lazaretto" Morse locates Joan in Leamington where she is in a relationship with a married man. When her father later visits her in "Harvest", she tells him she does not want to go back to Oxford, to the life she has led before. Thursday leaves, but delivers a short beating to her lover in the car park and warns him off. Out of the blue, Joan turns up at Morse's flat sporting a bruised cheek, explaining she's been thrown out by her paramour. He asks her to marry him, which she refuses. He then lends her some money to help her. Later, Morse gets a call when Joan is admitted to hospital. He visits her and learns from a doctor that she has "fallen" and has had a miscarriage.

==== Series 5 ====
In the first episode, "Muse", Morse runs into Joan in Oxford and the possibility of romance between them lingers, but is never acted upon, with Joan even encouraging Morse to date elsewhere. Joan is revealed to be emotionally distant from her father as well, as the two are having trouble reconciling following the events of the past year; consequently, Joan lives apart from her parents. In the final episode, however, she is able to mend the rift with her father, although her relationship with Morse is left ambiguous as Morse, spurred on by George's death, asks Joan out for a coffee, a request that she does not respond to immediately.

=== Winifred Thursday ===
Winifred Thursday, commonly called Win, is Inspector Thursday's wife and the mother of Joan and Sam Thursday. She is played by Caroline O'Neill.

Win married Fred Thursday in November, 1941 before he was shipped out to Africa; as she explained to Joan, they were married and permitted to go on honeymoon for one weekend before he had to return to the war. She is a devoted wife and mother and in the early episodes acts in a friendly, maternal fashion towards Morse, welcoming him into the home and helping to provide care when he is badly injured. As the wife of a detective-inspector, she patiently puts up with Thursday having to depart to solve a crime and sends her husband off in the morning with sandwiches and the daily command to 'Come home safe.'

In the later series, the toll of change affects Win badly; Sam's departure to the army, followed by the shock of Joan's involvement in a bank heist which results in her fleeing Oxford, causes her to suffer from depression which is worsened by Joan's refusal to make contact. She starts to recover with the help of medication, the structure of a part-time job and the joy of Joan's eventual return.

Win and Fred take up ballroom dancing during Series 5 and Win eagerly looks forward to Fred's retirement so that they can spend more time together as a couple. However, these plans are scuppered when Fred loans their savings to his brother Charlie, money which is consequently lost and leaves Fred unable to retire; these issues continue to affect the couple in Series 6, as Fred desperately resorts to intimidating witnesses and taking protection money from Box and Jago to make up his and Win's ruined finances. Disgusted by her husband's behaviour, Win becomes more distant than ever, to the point where she asks for a divorce; however, they reconcile by the series' end after Fred stands up to the corruption alongside Morse, Bright and Strange. Their marriage remains steady throughout Series 7 and although Fred is concerned when Win is among the first to discover a murder at her place of work, she remains stoic and tells Fred to find those responsible.

=== Sam Thursday ===
Sam Thursday is Inspector Thursday's son, portrayed by Jack Bannon. He originally has a job in Oxford but is preparing to serve in the British Army, a role which he departs for at the end of Series 3, a change which Win finds difficult to adapt to. Sam is the younger Thursday sibling; cheeky and charming and often bickering contentedly with his sister Joan, he is part of the regular and warm dynamic of the Thursday family, something which Morse is unused to. He is friendly and welcoming towards Morse, conversing with him often during the morning pick-ups and is one of the few characters whom Morse refers to by his first name, showing a more casual and comfortable acquaintance between the two of them.

Sam takes centre-stage in Series 5 Episode 4, Colours, when a murder takes place on his army base; as Sam was indirectly involved, he is treated as a suspect, resulting in his father's dismissal from the case. Army life has been shown to have had an impact on Sam; he becomes a more mature, rounded character and takes his position as a Corporal seriously, rebuking himself when he believes he has failed in his duty. He shows a respectful attitude towards his superiors as well as those in his military care, demonstrating loyalty to his army mates and arguing with his father over the arrest of someone whom he believes to be innocent. He also reveals, for the first time, the difficulties of growing up as the son of a policeman, particularly a prominent detective-inspector like his father.

=== Charlie Thursday ===
Charlie Thursday is Inspector Thursday's brother, portrayed by Phil Daniels. He inadvertently becomes caught up a long firm scam, using a loan provided by Fred, potentially incriminating him.

=== Paulette Thursday ===
Paulette Thursday is Charlie's wife, portrayed by Linette Beaumont. First seen in Series 5, Episode 2, Cartouche, when Charlie and his family visit Fred's family in Oxford.

=== Carol Thursday ===
Carol Thursday is Charlie and Paulette's daughter, portrayed by Emma Rigby. She appears to be a similar age to her cousin, Joan. First seen in Series 5, Episode 2, Cartouche, when Charlie and his family visit Fred's family in Oxford.

== Home Office ==
=== Dr. Max DeBryn ===
Dr. Max DeBryn is the Home Office Pathologist responsible for aiding the Oxford City Police in identification of dead bodies recovered, as well as postmortem on the bodies. Dr. DeBryn remains the pathologist for Thames Valley police in the first seven episodes of Inspector Morse.

DeBryn is first introduced in the Endeavour pilot (being the only other original character to feature in every episode of Endeavour, besides Morse himself) as the pathologist attending the apparent suicide of Miles Percival, meeting Morse for the first time at the scene. Sarcastic, dry-witted and an expert in the field of pathology, he is initially scornful of Morse's necrophobia, which culminates in Morse fainting at a post-mortem he is conducting; however, as the series progresses, he comes to recognise and respect Morse's capabilities as a detective and his loyalty to him extends to a willingness to pass confidential information onto Morse to help solve a case. He is also called upon, more than once, to provide medical care to Morse in the line of duty and also occasionally to others who have been injured, demonstrating his clear medical prowess. It quickly becomes obvious that DeBryn matches Morse in intellect and often quotes poets such as A.E. Housman to emphasise a point. In his role as a pathologist, DeBryn does not appreciate incompetency and is not afraid to take people to task for a lack of professionalism with his quiet but quick temper.

Despite his chosen profession, and his seemingly detached nature, DeBryn is quickly revealed to have a softer side: he is shaken by the murder of a child in the Series 2 episode 'Nocturne' and confides his anger to Morse, entreating him to find the person responsible and showing how he has come to put his faith in the detective. As a doctor, his upholding of the Hippocratic Oath means that he is willing to approach a dangerous situation to offer help to those in need; in Series 5 Episode 5, Quartet he is able to save the life of a young boy hit by a stray bullet although he is modest about accepting praise in the aftermath. He also holds a love and expertise for fishing, as well as baking; when Morse visits him in his home in Series 6, the doctor is revealed to live in a comfortable cottage with a beautiful garden, remarking to Morse that something has to be lovely. He remains loyal to Morse, Bright and Strange during the drastic changes at Castle Gate during Series 6, offering the three of them both personal and professional support while making his displeasure at the behaviour of Box and Jago known. Such is his loyalty that he ends up being abducted in the final episode of the series, Deguello, although he is rescued and continues his work in pathology.

== Other characters ==
=== Dorothea Frazil ===
Dorothea Frazil is the editor of the Oxford Mail Newspaper. Since the pilot episode, she has been portrayed by Abigail Thaw, the daughter of original Morse actor, John Thaw. Ms. Frazil helps Morse and the Oxford City Police with information pertaining to many different and difficult cases. Although her relationship with Morse is initially strained due to their respective professions and Morse's belief that any association with the newspaper would be corruptive, it soon softens to the point where the two consider each other as friends.

As a newspaper editor, Dorothea proves herself competent, confident and unafraid. Having spent time reporting in Korea, she seeks to write the truth in her newspaper and her enquiries can occasionally place her in the line of danger, although she proves herself to be unintimidated and refuses to back down from a difficult situation. Morse is angered when she is threatened by a prominent Don at the college at the end of Series 1 and during Series 4 has to team up with Thursday to rescue her when she is taken hostage as part of a case. She is one of the few who truly understands Morse's difficult temperament, on both a personal and professional level and recognises his need to successfully conclude a case, even when there are challenges involved.

In keeping with actress Abigail Thaw's family connections with the series, the name "Frazil" is a pun on Frazil ice vs. thaw.

=== Monica Hicks ===
Monica Hicks is a nurse of Jamaican descent who lives in the same house as Morse. A competent and dedicated nurse, she becomes the young Endeavour's love interest in the second series after caring for him when he suffered a concussion and inspiring and motivating him to finish a complicated case. However, the difficulties of Morse's role as a detective take their toll on the relationship and their romance appears to have ended when Morse was sent to jail at the end of Series 2, though they remain friends after his release, occasionally seeing each other at the hospital where Monica continues to work.

Monica is portrayed by Shvorne Marks.

=== Detective Inspector (DI) Bart Church, Oxfordshire Police CID ===
D.I. Church is the "guv" of the Oxfordshire (County) Police's Witney Station CID and was supervising Morse during his several months of "light duty" following his shooting. Inspector Church retires in December 1966, possibly forced out due to the rampant corruption in county and city police forces. Inspector Church is portrayed by Simon Kunz.

=== Lila Pilgrim ===
Lila Pilgrim is the ukulele strumming nightclub singer who performs in the Moonlight Rooms, the Oxford nightclub owned by East London gangster and enemy of DI Thursday, Vic Kasper.

=== Detective Constable (DC) George Fancy ===
DC George Fancy, played by Poldark’s Lewis Peek. He first appeared in Series 5 Episode 1, Muse and in the end, he dies in the gang crossfire at the end of Series 5 Episode 6, Icarus.

=== Detective Inspector (DI) Ronnie Box and Detective Sergeant (DS) Alan Jago ===
DI Ronnie Box and DS Alan Jago, portrayed by Simon Harrison and Richard Riddell respectively. They both appeared in Series 6 Episode 1 Pylon, and in the end, DS Jago was fatally shot by DS Endeavour Morse, while DI Box is seriously wounded at the end of Series 6 Episode 4, Degüello.
