= List of Polish films of 2014 =

The Polish film industry produced over sixty feature films in 2014. This article fully lists all non-pornographic films, including short films, that had a release date in that year and which were at least partly made by Poland. It does not include films first released in previous years that had release dates in 2014.
Also included is an overview of the major events in Polish film, including film festivals and awards ceremonies, as well as lists of those films that have been particularly well received, both critically and financially.

== Major releases ==
Opening		Title	Cast and Crew	Studio	Genre(s)	Ref.
J A N U A R Y	17	The Mighty Angel	Director: Wojciech Smarzowski; Cast: Robert Więckiewicz, Julia Kijowska, Adam Woronowicz		Drama	
F E B R U A R Y	7	Jack Strong	Director: Władysław Pasikowski; Cast: Marcin Dorociński, Maja Ostaszewska, Dagmara Dominczyk, Patrick Wilson	ITI Cinema	Thriller	
M A R C H	7	Closer to the Moon	Director: Nae Caranfil; Cast: Vera Farmiga, Mark Strong, Harry Lloyd	Mandragora Movies	Comedy; Drama	
J U N E	20	Secret Sharer	Director: Peter Fudakowski; Cast: Jack Laskey, Zhu Zhu	Premiere Releasing; Based on The Secret Sharer by Joseph Conrad	Romance; Thriller	
A U G U S T	31	The Cut	Director: Fatih Akın; Cast: Tahar Rahim		Drama	
S E P T E M B E R	25	Phoenix	Director: Christian Petzold; Cast: Nina Hoss, Ronald Zehrfeld, Nina Kunzendorf, Michael Maertens		Drama	
O C T O B E R	10	Bogowie	Director: Łukasz Palkowski; Cast: Tomasz Kot, Piotr Głowacki, Szymon Piotr Warszawski, Magdalena Czerwińska, Rafał Zawierucha		Drama	

== See also ==
- 2014 in film
- 2014 in Poland
- Cinema of Poland
- List of Polish submissions for the Academy Award for Best Foreign Language Film
