= List of Endeavour episodes =

British television detective drama series episodes

Endeavour is a British television detective drama series created by Russell Lewis and co-produced by Mammoth Screen and Masterpiece in association with ITV Studios. It is a prequel to the long-running Inspector Morse series and was first broadcast on ITV1 in the United Kingdom on 2 January 2012 and on PBS in the United States on 1 July 2012, as part of the Masterpiece Mystery! anthology. Nine series have been made, with the last broadcast on 12 March 2023.

== Series overview ==
Series	Episodes	Originally released		Average UK viewers (millions) inc. ITV HD and ITV+1
Series	Episodes	First released	Last released	Average UK viewers (millions) inc. ITV HD and ITV+1
Pilot		2 January 2012		8.21
1	4	14 April 2013	5 May 2013	7.04
2	4	30 March 2014	20 April 2014	6.78
3	4	3 January 2016	24 January 2016	6.82
4	4	8 January 2017	29 January 2017	7.07
5	6	4 February 2018	11 March 2018	6.67
6	4	10 February 2019	3 March 2019	7.16
7	3	9 February 2020	23 February 2020	6.80
8	3	12 September 2021	26 September 2021	5.22
9	3	26 February 2023	12 March 2023	5.13

== Episodes ==
=== Pilot (2012) ===
No. overall	No. in series	Title	Directed by	Written by	Original release date	UK viewers (millions) includes ITV HD and ITV +1
1	1	"Endeavour"	Colm McCarthy	Russell Lewis	2 January 2012	8.21
June 1965. An investigation into the murder of a 15-year-old schoolgirl and the apparent suicide of her boyfriend lead Oxford City Police to the discovery of illegal sex parties where under-age girls are procured for politicians, businessmen, Oxford dons, and policemen. Endeavour's superior, Detective Inspector Fred Thursday, recognising the young constable as a detective he can trust, takes him under his wing. Determined to break the case, he and Morse bring it to a successful conclusion. (Note: First appearances of Shaun Evans as DC Endeavour Morse (later DS Endeavour Morse), Roger Allam as DI Fred Thursday, James Bradshaw as Dr Max DeBryn and Abigail Thaw as Dorothea Frazil.)

=== Series 1 (2013) ===
No. overall	No. in series	Title	Directed by	Written by	Original release date	UK viewers (millions) includes ITV HD and ITV +1
2	1	"Girl"	Edward Bazalgette	Russell Lewis	14 April 2013	7.43
June 1965. The sudden death of a secretarial student named Margaret Bell and the shooting of a doctor appear unconnected, despite Morse's theories. Chief Superintendent Bright, the new commanding officer of the Oxford City Police, is unimpressed with Morse's zeal and protests to Detective Inspector Thursday that the bagman's position is a Detective Sergeant's job and the young constable is too inexperienced. Following the shooting of a vicar, Morse is reduced to general duties for dismissing a beautiful but mentally unstable girl as a suspect and must continue his investigations alone despite warnings of possible dismissal from his superiors. (Note: First appearances of Anton Lesser as CS Reginald Bright, Sean Rigby as PC Jim Strange (later DS Jim Strange) and Jack Laskey as DS Peter Jakes, along with Morse's first-ever meeting with Strange.)
3	2	"Fugue"	Tom Vaughan	Russell Lewis	21 April 2013	7.00
July 1965. An unknown menace stalks Oxford, appearing at first to be just another deranged lunatic, killing at random. But Morse uncovers an underlying method to the madness: the elaborate staging of the crimes suggests that the killer shares Endeavour's passion for opera. With Oxford city police scrambling to find the next potential victim, it seems that Endeavour has finally met his intellectual match. As the body count increases, letters containing cryptic clues, goading the police for their failures, are sent to the Oxford Mail. Only a detective of Endeavour's intellect can break them. At the climax, Morse saves Thursday from being thrown off a college roof and for his pains is put back on general duties, causing him to question his future as a detective. (Note: First appearances of Caroline O’Neill as Win Thursday, Sara Vickers as Joan Thursday and Jack Bannon as Sam Thursday.)
4	3	"Rocket"	Craig Viveiros	Russell Lewis	28 April 2013	7.11
September 1965. The prospect of a visit to Oxford by Her Royal Highness Princess Margaret, who is to unveil the British Imperial Electric Company's new "Standfast" Mark Two missile, has Chief Superintendent Bright on red alert. But when an unpopular worker is found murdered in a secluded area of the shop floor, Endeavour must pursue the truth - and then justice - from the sidelines and in the intoxicating presence of the firm's boss's secretary Alice Vexin, an old acquaintance from his days at Oxford. (Note: The plot draws heavily on The Lion in Winter and the Plantagenet family, with the firm owned by the Broom family (referring to the origin of the name Plantagenet), headed by the estranged couple Henry (referring to Henry II) and Nora (Eleanor of Aquitaine) and their sons Richard (Richard II) and Johnny (John) after the death of the eldest son Harry (Henry the Young King). Their home is Chinon Court (Chinon Castle), whilst Henry's secretary is Alice Vexin (Alys of France, Countess of Vexin) and Kendrick's fictional college is named after Henry II's nickname Curtmantle.)
5	4	"Home"	Colm McCarthy	Russell Lewis	5 May 2013	6.62
December 1965. Morse, still on general duties and studying for his forthcoming sergeant's exam, investigates an apparent hit-and-run accident that has claimed the life of an Oxford don. The victim had been at odds with his peers over the sale of a piece of college-owned land to a development company in conjunction with the town council. The case is complicated by the appearance in Oxford of an East London gangster named Vic Kasper, an enemy from DI Thursday's past, which reignites a personal feud, as Thursday thinks Kasper is somehow involved with the case. In the meantime, Morse makes a trip back home to Lincolnshire to visit his dying father.

=== Series 2 (2014) ===
No. overall	No. in series	Title	Directed by	Written by	Original release date	UK viewers (millions) includes ITV HD and ITV +1
6	1	"Trove"	Kristoffer Nyholm	Russell Lewis	30 March 2014	7.01
In May 1966, after returning from several months light duty spent at County (Oxfordshire) Police's Witney Station under D.I. Church, Morse investigates a suspicious suicide during an Oxford parade, a missing Oxfordshire girl, and the theft of historical artifacts from a college. A beauty pageant and local by-election draw Morse into disagreement with Inspector Thursday and Superintendent Bright when he believes the events are connected to the crimes, despite the evidence. A missing notebook and a Masonic lodge hamper the investigation.
7	2	"Nocturne"	Giuseppe Capotondi	Russell Lewis	6 April 2014	6.89
In July 1966 at the Museum of Natural History, almost empty save for some schoolgirls, Adrian Weiss, a specialist in heraldry and genealogy, is murdered. The girls are summer boarders at a nearby school, who stay because they are unable to join their families for the summer holidays. Some of them play pranks based on the story of the family that originally owned the school building. Several members of the family – which made a fortune in the tea trade with India – were murdered at their home 100 years earlier. The murder of a 12-year-old girl at the school leads the arrest of a fifth-generation descendant of the head of the family, who thought that a change in laws relating to inheritance through an illegitimate child could benefit him. He murders those in his way, which Morse works out by reading Weiss's detailed genealogic files. A masonic ring connected to the case goes missing. (Note: Filming took place at Bearwood House, Sindlesham.)
8	3	"Sway"	Andy Wilson	Russell Lewis	13 April 2014	6.58
In the period before Remembrance Sunday in November 1966, a housewife found strangled with a silk stocking in her own home becomes the third such death in Oxford in a month. All of the women are married and alone, and their wedding rings are missing. Morse traces the stockings to the sole local retailer, Burridges Department Store. Another of their customers is the next victim of the strangler, and a male employee is stabbed to death in the store. A number of suspects surface, and for Inspector Thursday, a face from the past he thought long dead leads to complications in his family life and with Morse.
9	4	"Neverland"	Geoffrey Sax	Russell Lewis	20 April 2014	6.63
In December 1966, a boy with a brutal father is reported missing from his home. The body of a journalist is found on a railway line, and within days an escaped convict with only a month of his sentence remaining is found dead. The two men have connections with Blenheim Vale, a disused correctional facility for boys in Kidlington, soon to be redeveloped as a police station for the new Thames Valley Police, into which Oxford City Police and Oxfordshire Constabulary are about to be merged. Thursday's and Morse's investigation leads to a property developer, child abuse and corruption in high places. As the episode closes, Morse is in jail and Thursday lies shot.

=== Series 3 (2016) ===
No. overall	No. in series	Title	Directed by	Written by	Original release date	UK viewers (millions) includes ITV HD and ITV+1
10	1	"Ride"	Sandra Goldbacher	Russell Lewis	3 January 2016	6.84
March 1967. Disillusioned after spending time in prison following his last case, even though exonerated, Morse ponders his future with the police. Having relocated to an isolated lakefront cottage, Morse takes up with some wealthy friends from his Oxford days and is befriended by unhappy millionaire Joss Bixby. At a funfair on Cowley Green a young woman, Jeannie Hearne, is spirited away into the night, seemingly without explanation. When her body is found the next morning, Inspector Thursday investigates and discovers a connection to Bixby. When the millionaire's body is found in the lake but he then appears the next day, Morse realises his future is as a detective and the solution lies at the funfair where Hearne went missing.
11	2	"Arcadia"	Bryn Higgins	Russell Lewis	10 January 2016	7.16
April 1967. The death of artist Simon Hallward in a horrendous house fire leaves Oxford City Police baffled as to the cause of the blaze. Morse and Thursday visit a cult-like commune Hallward had left several months prior. A young woman dies of a ‘stomach bug’ that has seen half of Chief Superintendent Bright’s men go on sick leave. Tainted food sold at a local supermarket, Richardson's, and the blackmail of the wealthy owners who refuse to pay culminates in the kidnap of their daughter with a ransom demand that appears to come from the dead artist. Morse strives to connect these elements to solve the deaths and kidnapping. WPC Shirley Trewlove joins the police station, and in the end DS Peter Jakes departs. (Note: Last appearance of Jack Laskey as DS Peter Jakes and first appearance of Dakota Blue Richards as WPC Shirley Trewlove.)
12	3	"Prey"	Lawrence Gough	Russell Lewis	17 January 2016	6.89
Early June 1967. The missing persons case of Danish au pair Ingrid Hjort reminds Thursday of a similar disappearance that took place exactly four years before. A search for a missing young man results in a gruesome finding – his severed arm. A birdwatcher's campsite is deserted – his tent and sleeping bag are shredded – and something kills a nearby family's dog and pet goat. The case proves far from routine, pulling Endeavour into the worlds of Oxford scientific academia, the city's vast parks, a troubled family and a legend said to haunt the wilderness of the Oxfordshire countryside.
13	4	"Coda"	Oliver Blackburn	Russell Lewis	24 January 2016	6.38
Mid June 1967. Gangland loyalties are tested when criminals vie to replace their dead boss Harry Rose. Police loyalties are tested when Fred Thursday is suspended for hitting an informant. Morse's loyalty to his old Oxford tutor unearths a possible connection to the murder of a businessman. Staff loyalties at the bank where Joan Thursday works are tested when armed robbers trap them along with Morse, who is there investigating the killing and payroll robbery. As hostages are taken and he and Joan try to conceal their identities, Morse realises he is part of someone else's plan to conceal another crime.

=== Series 4 (2017) ===
No. overall	No. in series	Title	Directed by	Written by	Original release date	UK viewers (millions) includes ITV HD and ITV+1
14	1	"Game"	Ashley Pearce	Russell Lewis	8 January 2017	7.56
July 1967. The body of a scientist, who disappeared over a month previously, is found floating in a local river. The initial suspected cause of death is accidental drowning, but Morse is unconvinced. When a second victim is found drowned at the local public baths, Morse begins to recognise a pattern. He connects the victims to a university science group who are undertaking work on one of the first working computer systems. The death of a third victim at the baths sways Morse to convince a skeptical Thursday to use computer technology to narrow down a possible list of suspects connected to the second victim. The discovery of another body at a farmhouse owned by one of the potential suspects leads Morse right into the path of the killer. Meanwhile, Morse is shocked by the news that his sergeant's exam papers have gone astray. Even worse, after confronting Bright, he discovers that his paper was the only one to have mysteriously disappeared. (Note: Jack Bannon as Sam Thursday is absent in this series.)
15	2	"Canticle"	Michael Lennox	Russell Lewis	15 January 2017	7.18
Labourer Barry Finch is found dead in the garage of a local public house, and initial reports suggest the cause of death is strangulation. Meanwhile, Morse is asked to act as bodyguard to busybody Joy Pettybon, a moral crusader who – since coming to Oxford to appear on a nightly television show, 'The Almanac' – has received threats to her life. Her fellow guests on the show – pop group The Wildwood, whose record Pettybon has tried to have banned from the airwaves – are prime suspects for sending the threats. When one of Pettybon's closest allies, Reverend Golightly, is poisoned shortly after her appearance on the show, suspicions on the tearaway group begin to grow. One of the group's founding members disappears during a writing session, thrusting Morse and Thursday are out into the dark, cold Oxford night to try and find him. When he finally is found, he in the throes of a "bad trip" from a large dose of LSD. When further tests are carried out on Barry Finch's corpse, traces of the drugs are also discovered, and Morse finds himself on the trail of a possible triple murderer.
16	3	"Lazaretto"	Börkur Sigþórsson	Russell Lewis	22 January 2017	6.77
Morse is called to deal with the death of an elderly Oxford resident, Mrs Zacharides, who appears to have died of natural causes. Meanwhile, the star witness in the case against the Matthews gang, Terence Bakewell, is admitted to hospital from remand, and Morse is assigned to act as bodyguard. Before he can leave the station, he and Thursday finds Bright collapsed in his office, suffering from a perforated ulcer. While on the ward, Morse meets a regular patient, Mr. Talbot, who tells him that Bed 10 has become infamous for unexplained deaths. An armed intruder tries to get to Bakewell, but Morse intercepts and pursues him. Following the breach of security, Bakewell is moved to the vacant Bed 10. When the ward staff arrive on shift the next morning, they discover that Bakewell, who appeared to have been in recovery, has died. As Morse starts trawling back through the victims of Bed 10, he discovers that Mr. Zacharides – who had died in Bed 10 six months prior – was murdered. Suspecting that the two cases are linked, Morse tries to unravel the clues to identify the killer. Back from surgery, Bright is moved into the vacant Bed 10.
17	4	"Harvest"	Jim Loach	Russell Lewis	29 January 2017	6.76
September 1967. The discovery of a body on an archaeological dig sends Morse to the village of Bramford, where botanist Matthew Laxman disappeared five years earlier and where pagan customs are practised for the forthcoming autumnal equinox. All the locals, including reclusive clairvoyant Dowsabelle Chattox, deny seeing Laxman until Selina Berger, sister of the local doctor, recalls seeing the missing man's car in the vicinity of the nearby nuclear power plant. While the plant's director Elliot Blake assures Morse that it poses no danger, it is not a welcome presence in the village, which is the proposed site of a new reservoir. When Morse finds Laxman's jacket on a scarecrow, he realizes the locals are lying. Dowsabelle and others admit that he came to Bramford, and evidence confirms he went to the power station. In fact, Laxman's body is found through the use of a geiger counter, reflecting the high dose of radiation he was exposed to. As the equinox celebrations proceed, the emergency alarm at the power station goes off, too early to be the usual drill. Morse and Thursday rush to the station to prevent an aggrieved avenger from destroying the whole area before unmasking Laxman's killer. Their bravery earns them both the George Medal and Morse his long-blocked promotion to Sergeant.

=== Series 5 (2018) ===
No. overall	No. in series	Title	Directed by	Written by	Original release date	UK viewers (millions) includes ITV HD and ITV+1
18	1	"Muse"	Brady Hood	Russell Lewis	4 February 2018	7.42
April 1968. Cab driver and ex-boxer Joey Sikes is killed on the night of an attempted theft of the last Fabergé egg from the Oxford college where it is to be auctioned. The next day Oxford don Robin Grey is murdered in his rooms. The link is sex worker and artists' model Eve Thorne, who was seen with both men. The next victim is art dealer Simon Lake, Grey's best friend who was organizing the auction. Thorne had been dropped off by Sikes outside the house where Lake was staying on the night the cab driver was murdered. The egg has disappeared. Thursday discovers that Lake and Grey belonged to an elite gentleman's club, and Morse – now a detective sergeant – finds that the two men were colluding with artist Gerald Pickman in an insurance fraud scheme involving theft of the egg, which may not be genuine. Pickman ran the art classes where Thorne modeled. In establishing whether the murders were linked to the club, the egg or Thorne, Morse must cope with a lazy new constable, George Fancy, and the reappearance of Joan Thursday. As the episode closes, radio news announces the assassination of Dr Martin Luther King Jr. in the US. (Note: First appearance of Lewis Peek as DC George Fancy.)
19	2	"Cartouche"	Andy Wilson	Russell Lewis	11 February 2018	6.61
May 1968. Ex-policeman and museum security guard Ronald Beavis is found dead after attending a showing of the vintage horror film 'The Pharaoh's Curse' at the Roxy cinema. No one on the theatre staff remembers Beavis, except for organist Leslie Garnier, who overheard him talking with someone on the building fire escape. Morse meets an attractive blond, Carol, and spends the night with her. He is shocked to finds she is the daughter of Fred Thursday's flash brother Charlie. Asked to show her around Oxford while Charlie and his wife take the Thursdays to dinner, Morse takes her to the Roxy for an event previewing a glossy sequel to 'The Pharaoh's Curse'. Egyptian archaeologist, Dr Shoukry, protests that the film cheapens his culture and that those responsible for the film "will answer for it". Shortly afterwards, Garnier collapses and dies, and a gift presented to the film's star, Emil Valdemar – intended to be a watch – contains an Egyptian scarab stolen from the museum. Evidence suggests that the cyanide-laced martini that poisoned Garnier was intended for Valdemar. Morse and Thursday rush to the cinema, where the killer is confronting Valdemar while the manager is setting a fire to hasten sale of the building. During the same time, racist attacks target properties owned by a local racketeer who has links with the Roxy and its employees. (Note: Shaun Evans also plays the explorer on the screen in 'The Pharaoh's Curse'.)
20	3	"Passenger"	Jim Field Smith	Russell Lewis	18 February 2018	6.73
June 1968. Morse and Fancy take the report of missing woman Frances Porter from her husband and sister. Morse finds she was meeting a lover, who admits dropping her at the local train station after their liaison. Searching along an abandoned line, Morse finds her body in a closed station. Newspaper editor Dorothea Frazil wonders if there's a connection with the unsolved murder from four years earlier of a teenager, whose body was found near another station. In both cases, the victim's shoes were missing. The discovery of another body – a co-worker of Porter's – reveals similarities to the other murders, but crime-scene details suggest another possibility. Thursday investigates a lorry hijack and murder, which he believes could be the work of local gangster Eddie Nero. But Fancy's contact with someone handling the stolen goods reveals another criminal who wants to take over from Nero. (Note: Guest appearance of Simon Harrison as DI Ronnie Box.)
21	4	"Colours"	Robert Quinn	Russell Lewis	25 February 2018	6.61
Summer 1968. Racial tensions rise in Oxford, from a debate featuring a former member of the British Union of Fascists to a protest outside a whites-only hair salon. Meanwhile, Thursday's son Sam discovers a murder at his Army base, one of three fashion models he and his comrades were escorting during a photo shoot. Evidence points to a friend of Sam's, a black soldier, who is arrested. Joan Thursday participates in the protest outside the salon and is among those arrested when a riot breaks out, but Strange arranges for her to be released without charge. When the body of the fashion photographer is found on the base, Morse must uncover long-held secrets to solve the case. Sam Thursday departs for his military deployment. (Note: Last appearance of Jack Bannon as Sam Thursday. Caroline Goodall appears as Lady Bayswater, a former Nazi sympathizer. And Rebecca Saire, the wife of Roger Allam, appears as Hazel Radowicz.)
22	5	"Quartet"	Geoffrey Sax	Russell Lewis	4 March 2018	6.42
September 1968. Morse investigates the assassination of a competitor at an international Jeux sans frontières event. One of the spectators, a small boy, is hit by a stray bullet. The dead man was supposedly from West Germany and his assassin from Switzerland. However, DeBryn notes that the German's dentures appear to have come from East Germany, and the real Swiss competitor is found murdered in his hotel room. Metropolitan Police's Special Branch quickly take over the case, but Morse delves deeper and is drawn into a web of espionage, big business and dark secrecy. Thursday faces a dilemma as he tries to protect the wife of a local newsagent from her violent husband.
23	6	"Icarus"	Gordon Anderson	Russell Lewis	11 March 2018	6.25
November 1968. Morse and WPC Trewlove go undercover to investigate the disappearance of a teacher from a public school. The case was assigned to Cowley Station after the local police looking into it were killed in an auto accident. In addition, Morse discovers that the son of gangster Eddie Nero is one of the students. When he discovers the body of a former student, Morse begins to question who can be trusted. Thursday grapples with the imminent closure of Cowley and his planned retirement. He also works to confirm the role of Cromwell Ames – a West Indian criminal trying to take over Nero's territory – in a series of unsolved murders. Having been assigned to follow Ames, DC Fancy is killed in the crossfire of a shootout that also kills Nero, Ames and members of both gangs. Trewlove transfers to the Metropolitan Police, and Thursday gets some bad news from his brother Charlie. (Note: Last appearances of Lewis Peek as DC George Fancy and Dakota Blue Richards as WPC Shirley Trewlove.)

=== Series 6 (2019) ===
No. overall	No. in series	Title	Directed by	Written by	Original release date	UK viewers (millions) includes ITV HD and ITV+1
24	1	"Pylon"	Johnny Kenton	Russell Lewis	10 February 2019	7.53
Early July 1969. Out of CID and sporting a moustache, Morse finds himself policing a lonely country patch in Banbury. But when he follows an escaped horse into a field and discovers the dead body of a missing schoolgirl next to a power line pylon, the quiet backwater becomes the focus of Castle Gate CID, now staffed by Thursday, demoted because of the death of George Fancy, and an old adversary. With the former's hands tied, Morse resolves to prove the innocence of an accused teenager and to uncover the truth behind the young girl's death. The investigation also solves the mystery of two other missing girls with very different outcomes. (Note: First appearances of Simon Harrison as DCI Ronnie Box and Richard Riddell as DS Alan Jago.)
25	2	"Apollo"	Shaun Evans	Russell Lewis	17 February 2019	7.09
Late July 1969. Morse's welcome to the Castle Gate CID is less than warm. As the highly-anticipated Apollo 11 moon landing draws near, he finds himself investigating the death of a promising young astrophysicist and his girlfriend. On first inspection, their deaths seem to be a result of a drunk driving car accident, but various clues point to foul play. Morse enlists the help of Thursday – injured in a stakeout gone wrong led by DCI Box – to uncover the truth. Finding the answer involves a studio producing a science fiction puppet show, a New Age institute, and a "swingers" party. (Note: This episode features the guest appearance of Thunderbirds-style Supermarionation puppets.)
26	3	"Confection"	Leanne Welham	Russell Lewis	24 February 2019	7.14
Mid-September 1969. The murder of a chocolate factory owner during a local hunt leads Morse to the sleepy village of Chigton Green. (Note: Chigton Green is a combination of town names and eponymous children's television programmes 'Camberwick Green' (1966), 'Trumpton' (1967) and 'Chigley' (1969), and in this 'Endeavour' episode there are characters named for characters in those children's shows: Carraway (Camberwick Green's fishmonger), Clamp (Trumpton's greengrocer), Farmer Bell (Camberwick Green), Cresswell (in Chigley the owner/manager of the biscuit factory, a factory called Cresswell's features in this 'Endeavour' episode).) On the same morning, a woman who worked at the factory is gunned down outside her home. Her husband's body is found inside, apparently having killed himself. A vicious campaign of gossip and rumour featuring poison pen notes could be behind what looks like a double murder/suicide. One of the note recipients, a beautiful, single mother, captures Morse's attention, giving him food for thought about the future. Meanwhile, Strange is continuing to pursue a series of heroin overdose deaths, and Thursday makes an out-of-character decision.
27	4	"Degüello"	Jamie Donoughue	Russell Lewis	3 March 2019	6.87
Mid-October 1969. When a librarian is gruesomely murdered at the Bodleian, Morse and Thursday have little to go on besides a set of muddy boot prints. With the two possible suspects known to have disagreements with the librarian, Morse digs deeper into their backgrounds. Persistent problems at a new high-rise tower block lead to a catastrophic building collapse, and DeBryn's examination of those deceased reveals a surprise. Tracking a trail of corruption and conspiracy that leads from the local council to senior levels of law enforcement exposes the connection between two seemingly unrelated crimes, confirms the source of the adulterated heroin that caused so many deaths, and finally solves the case that haunted the Cowley boys for the past year. In the end, DI Box shoots DS Jago dead and is seriously wounded by Jago. The team from Cowley is reunited at Castle Gate, and Morse moves into a familiar home. (Note: Last appearances of Simon Harrison as DI Ronnie Box and Richard Riddell as DS Alan Jago.)

=== Series 7 (2020) ===
No. overall	No. in series	Title	Directed by	Written by	Original release date	UK viewers (millions) includes ITV HD and ITV+1
28	1	"Oracle"	Shaun Evans	Russell Lewis	9 February 2020	7.25
January 1970. On holiday in Venice over New Years, Morse strikes up a sexual relationship with a woman named Violetta. During Morse's two-week absence, Thursday investigates the murder of Molly Andrews on a canal towpath and suspects her boyfriend, Carl Sturgis, but he has an alibi. In April, Morse is asked by Chief Superintendent Bright to take a second look at the case. A group of Oxford scientists are researching "latent brain activity" (ESP) using volunteers, one of whom was Andrews. One of the researchers, Dr. Naomi Benford, has a highly gifted volunteer, Jenny Tate, who saw the murder in her mind. But before she can give this information to Morse, Benford is found dead. When Morse has his wallet stolen at an outdoor concert, a man named Ludo, who claims to have known Morse at Oxford, comes to his aid. Over the next days, Ludo pursues a friendship with Morse – taking him to dinner and showing up at his home with an expensive bottle of wine. Thursday and Morse interview Jenny Tate, who tells them of her vision of the towpath killing, including a detail not released to the public. When one of Benford's colleagues is found to be her killer, Thursday believes he killed Andrews as well. Invited to a party at Ludo's elegant home, Morse is surprised to see Violetta there and shocked to learn she is Ludo's wife. (Note: Sara Vickers as Joan Thursday is absent in this series.)
29	2	"Raga"	Zam Salim	Russell Lewis	16 February 2020	6.73
June 1970. A man is killed on the same towpath as Molly Andrews. Unwilling to close the case after the suspect who confessed to Benford's murder was also charged with Andrews's murder, Thursday patrols the towpath at night. An Asian restaurant driver is lured to his death at the flat of a TV cooking-show personality, Oberon Prince, who has gone missing. Dorothea Frazil discusses the case with Morse and Thursday and mentions that she has covered six freak accidents in the past six months. Racial tensions in Oxford rise during the run-up to the general election when a Pakistani youth is fatally stabbed by a young supporter of far-right candidate Martin Gorman, whose daughter lives in the same building as Prince. Morse discovers Prince was a gambler in card games run by Gorman and had recently won a lot of money. Prince's dismembered body is found jammed into a suitcase. Ludo Talenti tells Morse his wife is away and invites Morse to his home, but when he arrives Violetta is there. She later secretly asks Morse to rekindle their affair, but he rebuffs her. Undeterred Violetta arrives at Morse's home, and he succumbs to her advances. Another woman is attacked on the towpath.
30	3	"Zenana"	Kate Saxon	Russell Lewis	23 February 2020	6.42
December 1970. After the latest murder on the towpath, Thursday arrests Carl Sturgis, despite the lack of evidence. When a student at the all-female Lady Matilda's college is found dead on the towpath, Morse and Thursday have a falling out in front of Strange and DeBryn. Sturgis is released, and Morse meets with Jenny Tate, whose visions have become terrifying. Ludo describes finding out about Morse's affair with Violetta, but she refuses to leave her husband. A fatal incident at Lady Matilda's college may be another of the freak accidents described by Dorothea Frazil, which Morse is now investigating. After Chief Superintendent Bright's wife is fatally electrocuted. Morse realizes that a fraud scheme is behind these 'accidents' — someone buys a person's life insurance policy (viatical) and then kills off the insured. Strange assists Morse in investigating his theory, and they both end up at a house occupied by Carl Sturgis, where they discover Jenny Tate held prisoner. Finding evidence of Ludo's involvement in the insurance-fraud scheme, Morse heads back to Venice and the opera house where he first met Violetta. Once there, he discovers that he has been a puppet in her husband’s plan. (Note: The life insurance scheme would not have been permitted under British law in 1970. It was not until the mid 1990s that viatical settlements were permitted in the United Kingdom.)

=== Series 8 (2021) ===
Series 8 was broadcast from 12 September 2021 and took place in 1971, with Russell Lewis writing and Shaun Evans, Ian Aryeh and Kate Saxon directing the episodes.

No. overall	No. in series	Title	Directed by	Written by	Original release date	UK viewers (millions) includes ITV HD and ITV+1
31	1	"Striker"	Shaun Evans	Russell Lewis	12 September 2021	5.35
February 1971. Though wearied from the events of the past year, there’s no chance of ‘light duties’ at the CID – crestfallen and rarely without a scotch in-hand, Endeavour finds himself right back in the thick of it. As DS Strange returns from sick leave, an explosive murder at an Oxford college has potentially far-reaching political ramifications. Meanwhile, the Irish Republican Army (IRA) have made a threat against the life of the Oxford Wanderers’ star striker, and Morse is tasked with the duty of acting bodyguard. A murder does occur after the big game, but another player is the victim. (Note: Sara Vickers as Joan Thursday returns in this series.)
32	2	"Scherzo"	Ian Aryeh	Russell Lewis	19 September 2021	5.03
May 1971. A cab driver who owes a large debt to a colleague is found dead in his taxi. Investigations into his death bring Morse and the team to a nearby nudist colony, where guests are making the most of the spring sunshine. The murders of a priest and of the master of Strange's Masonic lodge provide leads to a blue movie outfit in London’s Soho. Meanwhile, at home, Morse receives a guest who reminds him of a past he’d sooner forget. Despite his success in identifying the man who committed all three murders, Morse starts to retreat from those close to him and appears set on a course of wilful self-destruction.
33	3	"Terminus"	Kate Saxon	Russell Lewis	26 September 2021	5.27
November 1971. An Oxford don is killed in a violent attack shortly after getting off a bus. The Thursday family learns that son Sam has gone AWOL from the army in Northern Ireland, increasing stress on all of them. Morse begins to work on the murder of the bus passenger; however, it is discovered that he was on the bus with the victim but was too drunk to remember any details. Angry about Morse's drinking, Thursday insists that he take time off and seek assistance. Morse catches the same bus home, but it becomes trapped in a snowdrift. The passengers seek refuge at a hotel where there had been a mass murder several years earlier. When the passengers start being killed, Morse's investigation helps him through the experience of being trapped in the closed hotel, while experiencing symptoms of alcohol withdrawal. In the end, the sun comes out as the snow begins to thaw. Morse agrees to take the recommended time off to address his issues.

=== Series 9 (2023) ===
Series 9 was broadcast on 26 February 2023, with all three episodes set in 1972. It is the final series produced, by agreement of PBS Masterpiece, ITV and the cast. Russell Lewis wrote all episodes, with Shaun Evans, Nirpal Bhogal and Kate Saxon directing. The story comes to its logical end, telling how Inspector Morse developed into the character of the Morse series, across 72 hours of television episodes in ten years. Filming started in Oxford on 22 May 2022. The announcement of the final series was made a week or so before series 8 began airing in the US on 19 June 2022. The formal release for audiences in the United States, via PBS 'Masterpiece' was Sunday, June 18 at 9:00 p.m.

No. overall	No. in series	Title	Directed by	Written by	Original release date	UK viewers (millions) includes ITV HD and ITV+1
34	1	"Prelude"	Shaun Evans	Russell Lewis	26 February 2023	5.04
Summer 1972. Morse’s phased return to Castle Gate coincides with another homecoming, that of the Oxford Concert Orchestra, led by conductor Sir Alexander Lermontov. A gruesome discovery in a college garden leads Morse and Thursday to the orchestra's door, and when a second tragedy hits within the orchestra itself, they uncover a web of secrets. Meanwhile, grisly London business turns up in Oxford, and a criminal from "The Smoke" is brutally murdered in a derelict warehouse. As the mystery unfolds, Morse and Thursday realise there are some unsettling ties to a case the pair had hoped was long since behind them. Released from the military prison where he was sent after going AWOL, Sam Thursday returns home but has started drinking heavily. When Morse takes him to visit Joan, he learns she is engaged to Strange. (Note: Simon Harrison as Ronnie Box and Jack Bannon as Sam Thursday both return in this series.)
35	2	"Uniform"	Nirpal Bhogal	Russell Lewis	5 March 2023	5.00
Morse suspects a connection between a woman’s disappearance and her past employer, a property developer associated with the Blenheim Vale scandal. However, another missing persons case – that of an artist, whose work adorns the covers of a series of detective novels – demands his attention. Meanwhile, reports flood in of smashed and stolen cars, wanton criminal damage, and the fatal beating of a homeless man, as a debauched group of university undergraduates wreak havoc. The apparent murder of a uniformed officer sees Bright command all hands on deck while, much to Morse and Thursday’s chagrin, the cast of a television detective series, Jolly For Short, are in town filming the final episodes. As the shadows of Blenheim Vale deepen, an old colleague unexpectedly returns. (Note: Last guest appearance of Simon Harrison as Ronnie Box and Jack Laskey returns in this series as DS Peter Jakes.)
36	3	"Exeunt"	Kate Saxon	Russell Lewis	12 March 2023	5.35
Final episode. Morse investigates a number of death notices that appeared in the Oxford Mail before the actual deaths, which appeared to be accidental. Thursday receives a warning from a former colleague to stop the investigation into events at Blenheim Vale. While Strange may be transferred to Kidlington, Bright plans retirement. The Blenheim Vale case comes to an unexpected end. Thursday's need to protect his family presents a difficult challenge. After bidding farewell to his mentor, Morse drives off in his black Jaguar, passing a familiar-looking red one. (Note: Last regular appearances of Shaun Evans as DS Endeavour Morse, Roger Allam as DCI Fred Thursday, James Bradshaw as Dr Max DeBryn, Anton Lesser as CS Reginald Bright, Sean Rigby as DS Jim Strange, Caroline O'Neill as Win Thursday, Sara Vickers as Joan Thursday, Jack Laskey as Peter Jakes and Jack Bannon as Sam Thursday.)
