= Eddie Nero =

Eddie Nero may refer to:

- A fictional movie star in Californication (TV series).
- A fictional mob boss in Endeavour.
