= Behind Closed Doors (2003 film) =

2003 British television film

- Written by: Tim O'Mara; Kate Wood
- Directed by: Louis Caulfield
- Starring: Tilly Gerrard; Liam Noble; Victoria Willing; Aaron Johnson
- Theme music composer: John Harle
- Country of origin: United Kingdom
- Original language: English

Production
- Producer: Diana Kyle/>Seetha Kumar
- Cinematography: Ben Joiner
- Editor: Anthony Combes
- Running time: 44 minutes

Original release
- Release: 16 February 2003

Behind Closed Doors is a 2003 Television Film.

== Plot ==
Holly, Kara and Brian Phillips move to a new area. Soon after arriving Holly befriends her 11-year-old neighbor and she starts to suspect the boy is being beaten by his mother's boyfriend.

== Cast ==
- Tilly Gerrard as Holly Phillips
- Liam Noble as Brian Phillips
- Victoria Willing as Kara Phillips
- Aaron Johnson as Sam Goodwin
- Caroline O'Neill as Nikki Goodwin
- James Thornton as Joe Healy
- Natasha Dawson as Cassie Hall
- Vicky Elliott as Alex
- Michael Hayes as Simon
- Julie-Anne Blythen as Miss Williams
- Marc Small as Case Officer
- Sakuntala Ramanee as Nurse
