= Michael Laskey =

English poet and editor (born 1944)

- Born: 15 August 1944 (age 82); Lichfield, Staffordshire
- Education: St John's College, Cambridge
- Occupations: Poet, editor
- Children: 3, including Jack
- Awards: King's Gold Medal for Poetry (2025) Suffolk Medal (2026)

Michael George Laskey (born 15 August 1944) is an English poet and editor.

== Life ==
Born in Lichfield, Staffordshire. Laskey was educated at Gresham's School and St John's College, Cambridge, where he read English. After Cambridge, Laskey worked for ten years as a teacher in secondary schools and further education in Spain and England.

Laskey has published four poetry collections, including New & Selected Poems (2008), and three pamphlets. In 1999 Laskey was shortlisted for the T. S. Eliot Prize for his collection The Tightrope Wedding.

In 1989, Laskey founded the international Aldeburgh Poetry Festival and served as its director for ten years. He subsequently became chairman of The Poetry Trust (the organisation that runs the Festival), 2003–2008. In 1991, with Roy Blackman he founded the poetry magazine Smiths Knoll, and since 2002 has edited it (with Joanna Cutts). In 2005 he was awarded an Arts Council International Writing Fellowship at the Banff Centre in Canada.

Laskey now works as a freelance writer, running workshops and teaching creative writing for many organisations. including the University of East Anglia, the Arvon Foundation, the Open College of the Arts, and in schools.

Laskey is married to a general practitioner, and they have three sons, including the actor Jack Laskey. Since 1978, they have lived in Suffolk.

== Publications ==
- Cloves of Garlic (1988) (which won the Poetry Business Pamphlet Competition)
- Thinking of Happiness (Peterloo, 1991) (Poetry Book Society Recommendation)
- The Tightrope Wedding (Smith/Doorstop, 1999) (Poetry Book Society Recommendation and shortlisted for the T. S. Eliot Prize)
- In the Fruit Cage (1997)
- Permission to Breathe (Smith/Doorstop, 2004)
- Living by the Sea (Smith/Doorstop, 2007)
- The Man Alone: New & Selected Poems (Smith/Doorstop, 2008)

=== As Editor ===
- The Aldeburgh Poetry Festival Anthology 1989–1998 (ed.) (Aldeburgh Poetry Trust, 1999)
- The Difference by Anthony Wilson (Aldeburgh Poetry Trust, 1999)
- The Watermen by Roy Blackman (Smiths Knoll, 2003)
- A Small Sun by Mourid Barghouti (Aldeburgh Poetry Trust, 2003)
- Irresistible to Women by Dean Parkin (Garlic Press, 2003)
- Football on Waste Ground by Richard Kemp (Smiths Knoll, 2006)
- The Devil's Cut by Miranda Burton (Smiths Knoll, 2007)
- Hooks Working Loose by Margaret Easton (Garlic Press, 2007)
- Just Our Luck by Dean Parkin (Garlic Press, 2008)
