= Smiths Knoll =

Smiths Knoll was a poetry periodical, published in the United Kingdom. It was founded by Roy Blackman and Michael Laskey in 1991 and named after a former lightvessel station off the Norfolk coast, near Haisborough Sands.

It was edited by Roy Blackman until 2002 when Joanna Cutts began to serve in the post. Issue 50, published on 2 November 2012, was the final issue of the magazine.
