= Chief Superintendent Strange =

Chief Superintendent Jim Strange OBE
- Endeavour; Inspector Morse character
- Created by: Colin Dexter
- Portrayed by: James Grout (television) (1987–2000); Sean Rigby (television) (2013–2023)
- Also portrayed by: John Hartley (BBC Radio) (1994–96); Pip Torrens (BBC Radio) (2017-2018) (2025)

In-universe information
- Title: Chief Superintendent
- Affiliation: Oxford City Police; Thames Valley Police
- Spouse: Joan Thursday
- Relatives: unnamed brother DCI Fred Thursday GM (father-in-law); Win Thursday (mother-in-law); Sam Thursday (brother-in-law)
- Nationality: British
- Decorations: Officer of the Most Excellent Order of the British Empire

Detective Chief Superintendent Jim Strange OBE is a fictional character in the television series Inspector Morse, played by James Grout. The character also appears, as a Police Constable and Detective Sergeant, in the prequel series Endeavour, portrayed by Sean Rigby. Although Strange does not appear in every episode of Inspector Morse, he is present in the whole series (of 33 2-hour TV films) from beginning to end. He is absent from only a few of the intervening episodes. Strange's first name is never revealed in the Inspector Morse series.

In the episode "Twilight of the Gods", Strange is seen wearing a miniature form of the OBE medal on his suit, indicating he is the holder of the national honour.

== Portrayal ==
Strange was played by British actor James Grout (1927–2012), with Grout's BBC obituary stating it was the best-known character he had played. In the subsequent prequel series Endeavour, Strange is played by Sean Rigby. Here the character is a uniformed Police Constable, working alongside the young Detective Constable Morse. PC Jim (Note: The diminutive form of Grout's first name) Strange interacts with the young Morse in a number of ways which point to the origins of later aspects of their relationship in the Inspector Morse series.

== Character ==
Numerous photographs, plaques, and model ships seen in the background of his office as Chief Superintendent suggest prior service with the Royal Navy Submarine Service. As a young Constable in Endeavour, Strange is already in the habit of addressing people as "matey". Slightly overweight, and given to bouts of pomposity, he is nonetheless a dependable and honest policeman, with his mind set on a career in the police. During the second series of Endeavour, Strange is invited to become a Freemason and accepts. During the third series, set in 1967, he is promoted to Sergeant and subsequently moves from uniform to the Criminal Investigation Department as Morse's immediate superior. Morse questions whether Strange's involvement with Freemasonry may be behind his promotion, and Strange admits that this may be so, although, unlike Morse, he sees nothing wrong with this, saying that you have to "play the game" to get ahead. He uses that connection for Morse's benefit in the sixth series, getting Morse transferred back to CID by telling Assistant Chief Constable Bottoms that Morse is a member of "one of the college lodges, I believe." Strange is also proud of the good works that he and his lodge do for charity, as he tells Joan Thursday in the eighth series.

Strange's wife, Joan, is the daughter of his and Morse's first CID guv, DCI Fred Thursday GM, and is a woman for whom Morse had silently pined for years. In 1972, Thursday sends the newly married couple to Kidlington for several months, where Strange's secondment keeps them both safe from the fallout from the investigation and exhumations at the disused Blenheim Vale boys home, and from a biker gang's retribution for the death of drug dealer Tomahawk Kennett. Thursday tells Strange, however, only that Kidlington is expanding, with more opportunities for advancement. Joan is never seen in Inspector Morse and is referred to in that series only as "Mrs. Strange".

By the chronologically later stage of the (earlier) Inspector Morse series, Strange, holding the rank of Chief Superintendent, is the Divisional Commander for Oxford, of the Thames Valley Police force. His relationship with the principal character, Morse, is at times turbulent. Strange is a traditionalist, a Freemason, and a stickler for rules and regulations. Morse is also a traditionalist, but not in the same conservative sense as Strange; likewise, Morse is not interested in Freemasonry, although he proves knowledgeable on the subject, and in the 15th episode Masonic Mysteries proves his knowledge from the sublime (deep symbolism of masonry) to the less so (revealing to a junior traffic cop that he knows the masonic handshake, and that he is fully aware of which members of the local police are in the lodge); it is certainly true that the rules and regulations often frustrate Morse, and this leads to disagreements with Strange – a theme also picked up by the prequel, which shows the two characters disagreeing over the importance of rules in series 1, episode 1.

However, it is also clear that Strange has a deep respect for Morse, even if not always appreciating his methods. Despite often addressing Morse, somewhat dismissively, as "matey", a clear mutual respect eventually shines through their relationship – in the final episode, The Remorseful Day, in which Morse dies, Strange's attitude towards Morse might even be described as fond and affectionate. This is even more apparent in the original novel in which Morse is shown to have acted to prevent a potential embarrassment for Strange. The "matey" form of address is explained in the prequel as a common form of address by Strange for all his acquaintances. Strange is at Morse's hospital bedside when the latter dies, and he telephones Lewis with the news.

Chief Superintendent Strange also shows a clear respect for and of Sergeant Lewis, Morse's loyal assistant, sometimes consulting him directly, and occasionally even (as in Dead on Time) approving his ideas without reference to Morse. Ultimately Strange gives Lewis strong encouragement to seek promotion to Detective Inspector, as indeed he had encouraged him earlier in the series to apply for a vacant Inspector's position in the Oxford traffic police. However, the character does not appear in the sequel series Lewis, in the timeline of which, he appears to have retired.
