= Secret Sharer (film) =

2014 film by Peter Fudakowski

- Film poster
- Directed by: Peter Fudakowski
- Written by: Peter Fudakowski
- Based on: The Secret Sharer by Joseph Conrad
- Produced by: Tom Waller
- Starring: Jack Laskey; Zhu Zhu
- Cinematography: Michal Tywoniuk
- Edited by: Jaroslaw Barzan
- Music by: Guy Farley
- Production companies: Premiere Productions; The UK Film & TV Production Company PLC; Secret Sharer sp. z o.o.
- Distributed by: Premiere Releasing
- Release date: 20 June 2014
- Running time: 103 minutes
- Countries: United Kingdom; Poland
- Languages: English; Mandarin

Secret Sharer is a 2014 Anglo-Polish romantic thriller based on Joseph Conrad’s 1909 novella The Secret Sharer. It is directed and written by Peter Fudakowski, and it stars Jack Laskey and Zhu Zhu. It was released in the United Kingdom on 20 June 2014.

The film was screened at the CMU International Film Festival the Sedona International Film Festival, and the Carnegie Mellon University International Film Festival.

Reviews of the film were mixed. There was criticism of the storyline, and praise for the cinematography.

== Plot ==
In the present day Gulf of Thailand, novice sea captain Konrad (Jack Laskey) tries to master a Chinese cargo ship and its resentful crew, who suspect he has orders from his boss to scuttle the vessel as part of an insurance scam.

The crew abandons ship, and later Konrad finds a naked body clinging to the ship's rope ladder. Pulling on the ladder, he finds a young Chinese woman named Li (Zhu Zhu), exhausted from swimming across from the only other ship anchored in the bay. She whispers "Hide me", and he agrees to give her shelter.

The next morning a search party arrives from the other ship, along with Konrad's crew, looking for a woman they claim to be a murderer.

Konrad takes a risk and does not give Li up. Over the remainder of the journey, he shares his food, thoughts, clothes and cabin with his stowaway, keeping her presence on board the ship a secret from his crew, who would use any excuse to strip him of his captaincy. Konrad sets a course that avoids Chinese territorial waters and puzzles over how to help Li escape to freedom and start a new life.

As the journey progresses and romance grows within the captain's cabin, Konrad begins to win the respect of his crew under Li's guidance. Updated orders come from the ship's owner instructing Konrad to scuttle the ship before an upcoming storm, and promising a large bonus for doing so. Konrad, however, begins to question his mission.

== Cast ==
- Jack Laskey as Konrad
- Zhu Zhu as Li
- Ching-ting Hsia as Mong Lin
- Leon Dai as Captain Wang
- Si Qin Chao Ke Tu as Engineer
- K.M. Lo as Chang
- Ying Wang as Yang Shu's Girl
- Guo Zhongyou as Cook
- Aroon Wanasbodeewong as Steward
- Sittinont Ananvorakhun as Assistant Cook
- Song Bin Zhu as The Boss
- Bao Yin Ni Mu Hu as Yang Shu

== Production ==
=== Music ===
The film's musical score was composed by Guy Farley, a composer and musician who had to date worked on other films including The Hot Potato and Knife Edge. A soundtrack album of the film's music was released Caldera Records in February 2014, several months before the film's release.

== Soundtrack ==
No.	Title	Length
1.	"Theme"	2:11
2.	"My Own Ship"	0:44
3.	"Sudden Promotion"	2:15
4.	"Gulf Of Thailand"	2:40
5.	"In A Neat Pile"	2:08
6.	"At Sea"	2:38
7.	"The Girl"	2:22
8.	"Come To Life"	2:21
9.	"What Will You Do"	1:51
10.	"The Necklace"	0:58
11.	"A Fight"	2:13
12.	"Man Overboard"	2:27
13.	"Few Want To Love"	1:54
14.	"Horizons"	2:15
15.	"Dangerous Waters"	3:25
16.	"Short Like Yours"	2:24
17.	"Small Islands"	3:20
18.	"Xiamen"	0:58
19.	"Title Theme"	2:38
Total length:		41:42
