= The Secret Sharer =

1910 short story by Joseph Conrad

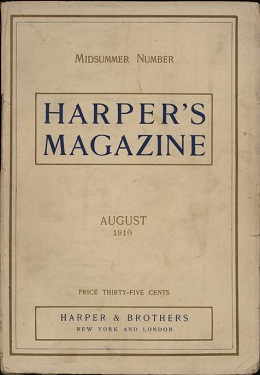
- August 1910 edition of Harper's Magazine
- Author: Joseph Conrad
- Language: English
- Genre: Short story
- Publisher: Harper's Magazine
- Publication date: 1910

"The Secret Sharer" is a short story by Polish-British author Joseph Conrad, originally written in 1909 and first published in two parts in the August and September 1910 editions of Harper's Magazine. It was later included in the short story collection Twixt Land and Sea (1912).

== Plot summary ==
The story is written from the first-person point-of-view, in which the unnamed captain is the narrator. Recently commissioned to command his first ship, he is unfamiliar with both the vessel and its crew. The youthful captain, to the surprise of his officers, takes the evening watch. That night, with the crew below deck, he discovers a naked half-submerged figure clinging to a rope ladder: it is the first mate named Leggatt from the Sephora, the only other ship anchored in the bay. He explains he is a fugitive from the ship, having been arrested by the ship’s captain for killing a crew member during a violent storm.

After hearing his story, the captain—rather than summoning an officer to seize the man—fetches clothing for him and conceals him in his quarters. The captain recognizes in Leggatt a youthful “double” of himself: The two men are similar in appearance, personal history and maritime experience and aspirations. They differ in that Leggatt has had the bad fortune to have been embroiled in a conflict with a troublesome deck hand, ending in a violent confrontation during a typhoon, in which the vessel is almost lost. Leggatt’s efforts save the ship and the crew, but the captain of the Sephora puts him in shackles allegedly for murder.

The youthful captain comprehends the gravity of Leggatt’s situation, and is determined to protect him. The steps necessary to keep the crew ignorant of the stowaway involve a number of evasive tactics and near discoveries. When the Sephora’s elderly captain arrives to make inquiries as to the whereabouts of his first mate, the young captain adroitly deflects his suspicions. To his chagrin, the Sephora’s captain departs empty-handed. The local authorities are notified of Leggatt’s escape and he risks arrest if he swims directly to shore.

Favorable winds develop and the captain orders the ship to set sail. In an effort to facilitate Leggatt's escape, he takes the boat near a point on the mainland where Leggatt might swim to shore and evade detection. The maneuver is extremely risky, and the crew and officers, ignorant of the captain’s motives, are dismayed.

Certain that Leggatt has made his escape, the captain resumes course.

== Background ==
Conrad wrote “The Secret Sharer” in a matter of weeks at the end of 1909 which was “exceptionally quick for him.” Conrad found that his American publisher, Harper & Brothers, and its president Colonel George Harvey were particularly receptive to his material. Between 1903 and 1913, they would publish five of his novels and four works of his short fiction. “The Secret Sharer” appeared in Harper’s Magazine in August–September 1910.

“The Secret Sharer” is based on an incident that occurred aboard the Cutty Sark in 1881, reported when the vessel arrived in Singapore. The first mate of the Cutty Sark—“a despotic character with a sinister reputation”—had killed an insubordinate crew member who had defended himself against the mate’s threatening behavior with a capstan bar. Conrad’s fictional first mate Leggatt, who has fled from his ship Sephora, is presented as a victim of circumstances that compels him to commit homicide. Indeed, Conrad altered the reports from the Cutty Sark incident “to make Leggatt more agreeable.”

Conrad’s own early experiences as a newly-commissioned captain commanding his first ship are also tapped in “The Secret Sharer”, in which the youthful narrator is described as “a stranger to the ship” and “somewhat of a stranger to myself.”

According to biographer Joycelyn Baines “Honor and dishonor, in their particular aspects of fidelity and betrayal, were constantly recurring themes throughout Conrad’s work. It is clear from ‘The Secret Sharer’ that he was especially concerned with them” at the time he wrote it in 1909.

== Critical assessment ==
“The Secret Sharer” is among the most analyzed of Conrad’s oeuvre, a work that has been “endlessly debated.”

Biographer Jocelyn Baines, while acknowledging that “The Secret Sharer” is “undoubtedly one of his best short stories” adds this caveat: “Albert J. Guerard and Douglas Hewitt have claimed for it a position as a key in Conrad’s work and attributed to it a significance which I do not believe that it can hold. It is intensely dramatic but, on the psychological and moral level, rather slight.”

== Theme ==
“‘The Secret Sharer’, widely acclaimed as a psychological masterpiece, [is] the subject of more fanciful interpretations than any of Conrad’s other stories. Yet no one who has written on this problematical tale has given a wholly reliable sense of its peculiar distinction. Polemical and highly selective, the average reading of ‘The Secret Sharer’ is easily open to charges of partiality or distortion.”—Literary critic Laurence Graver in Conrad’s Short Fiction (1969)

According to Baines “the point of the story”, dramatized through the intimate encounter between the captain and the fugitive first mate Leggatt “is to suggest that the fates of these two men were interchangeable, that it was quite possible for an ordinary, decent, conscientious person to…commit some action that would make him ‘a fugitive and vagabond upon the earth.”

Literary critic Joan E. Steiner emphasizes the similarity in the two men’s personal history, careers, physical appearance and moral foundations inviting the young captain “to regard Leggatt as his double…” Baines argues that Conrad’s captain is sympathetic to his double:

Conrad had no wish to condemn Leggatt but considered him an honorable man who had done something that other honorable men might equally well have done in similar circumstances.

Baines denies that there is any “moral dilemma” that informs the relationship between the captain and his “doppleganger.” Leggatt departs from the ship “...a free man, a proud swimmer striking out for a new destiny.”

Both Baines and literary critic Laurence Garland dispute Albert J. Guerard’s contention that the captain’s double must be “exorcized” as a threat to his freedom. Graver rejects Guerard’s interpretation, writing:

Leggatt’s attractiveness is based less on some sinister appeal than on an obvious self-possession and strength…By the end, the captain has learned nothing about his own capacity for evil; he has learned only to assume confident command of his ship.

Literary critic Edward W. Said concurs with Guerard’s analysis of “The Secret Sharer” that “Conrad’s basic theme is the conflict between the mariner [captain-narrator] and the outlaw [Leggatt]; between the man who seeks to establish control by finding his place among the hard, infallible objects of external reality and that other, darker figure who immerses himself in the destructive, chaotic jungle within and without.”

According to Steiner, the doubling device, though not a Conrad invention, appears as the key image in the narrative. Indeed, the terms “my other self”, “my secret self”, “my secret sharer” appear repeatedly: the captain refers to his doppelganger, Leggatt, as “my double” a total of eighteen times. The Leggatt double and his influence on the captain’s struggle for self-discovery is ambiguous. Rather than the “double” exerting an explicitly creative or degenerate influence on the captain, he serves to reveal that “irrational and instinctive elements in human nature can be a source of strength as well as weakness, good as well as evil.” Steiner tends to align herself with critics Baines and Graver, namely, that Leggatt’s effect is “more positive than negative.”

Steiner concludes that the departure of Leggatt signals “the re-submergence of the captain’s unconscious and the reintegration of his personality…the narrator has moved, with the assistance of his double, from immature and naive integration…to a more mature reintegration resulting from self-knowledge and self-mastery.”

== Adaptations ==
The story was adapted for a segment of the 1952 film Face to Face, and also for a one-act play in 1969 by C. R. (Chuck) Wobbe. Robert Silverberg adapted the story to a science fiction setting under the same title in 1987, winning the Locus Award for best novella. A film, Secret Sharer, inspired by the story and directed by Peter Fudakowski, was released in the United Kingdom in June 2014. A new multimedia performance version using dance, music, sound, text, and art installation premiered at ArtsEmerson in Boston in April 2026.

== Sources ==
- Baines, Jocelyn. 1960. Joseph Conrad: A Critical Biography McGraw-Hill Book Company, New York. ISBN 978-0297167556
- Graver, Laurence. 1969. Conrad’s Short Fiction. University of California Press, Berkeley, California. ISBN 0-520-00513-9
- Guerard, Albert J. 1965. Conrad: The Novelist. Harvard University Press, Cambridge, Massachusetts. LOC Catalog Card Number 58-8995. ISBN 978-0674163508
- Said, Edward W.. 1966. The Past and Present: Conrad’s Shorter Fiction, from Said’s Josef Conrad and the Fiction of Autobiography.Harvard University Press, in Joseph Conrad: Modern Critical Reviews, Harold Bloom editor. Chelsea House Publishers. 1987 pp. 29–51 ISBN 0-87754-642-8
- Steiner, Joan E. 1980. “The Secret Sharer”: Complexities of the Doubling Relationship in Joseph Conrad Joseph Conrad: Modern Critical Reviews, Harold Bloom editor. Chelsea House Publishers. 1987 pp. 101–112 ISBN 0-87754-642-8
