= Sara Vickers =

Scottish theatre, TV, and film actress (born 1985)

- Born: Sara Louise Vickers; 1985 (age 40–41); Strathaven, South Lanarkshire, Scotland
- Education: Royal Academy of Dramatic Art
- Occupation: Actor
- Years active: 2003–present
- Spouse: Kerr Logan (m. 2017)
- Children: 2

Sara Louise Vickers (born 1985) is a Scottish theatre, television, and film actress best known for playing Joan Thursday in the British television detective drama series Endeavour (2013–2023).

== Early life and education ==
Vickers was born in 1985, in Strathaven, Scotland, and grew up in Edinburgh. She graduated with 1st in psychology & anthropology from Glasgow university in 2006. She graduated with a BA from the Royal Academy of Dramatic Art in 2010.

== Career ==
=== Theatre ===
In 2010, Vickers appeared in Henrik Ibsen's The Lady from the Sea, adapted by David Eldridge and directed by Sarah Frankcom at the Royal Exchange Theatre in Manchester. Playing Dr Wangel's daughter, Bolette, she was reviewed in The Independent as giving a "lively identity" to the role. The British Theatre Guide described her performance as "very good". A review in The Telegraph said she "brim[s] with forceful vitality".

In 2011, she was Maia in Judgement Day, based on Ibsen's last work When We Dead Awaken, directed James Dacre at the Print Room, Notting Hill Gate, her performance described as "brimming with intelligence and frustrated sexuality". The Evening Standard called her "the lively Sara Vickers". The Guardian's Michael Billington gave the production four stars, saying that Vickers "lends Rubek's young wife the spirit of a caged animal".

In November and December 2011, she played Annabella in 'Tis Pity She's a Whore at the West Yorkshire Playhouse. Alfred Hickling in The Guardian, giving the production three stars, wrote that Vickers "makes a plaintive case for Annabella". For her performance she received a Commendation at the Ian Charleson Awards.

In September and October 2013, she appeared as Alexandra McArthur in Dark Road, co-written by Ian Rankin, at the Royal Lyceum in Edinburgh. The Independent called her "a strong Sara Vickers", and The Scotsman, "a fine Sara Vickers".

In 2014, Vickers played Juliet in Romeo and Juliet, directed by Walter Meierjohann, at Victoria Baths in Manchester. Her performance was described as "defiant and energetic, really showing off the youthfulness of Juliet". The Manchester Evening News said she was "occasionally transporting".

=== Television ===
Vickers performed the role of Margaret Campbell in the 2012 BBC TV film Bert and Dickie.

Since 2013, she has played the recurring character of Joan Thursday in the Mammoth Screen-produced British television detective drama series Endeavour for ITV, appeared through the 2019 series six, and returned in the 2021 series eight. In 2013, she was Connie Charles in the five episode BBC One drama series Privates.

In 2015, she had a supporting role in Waterloo's Warriors, directed by Ruán Magan, a docudrama produced by Caledonia Television for the BBC. That same year she was the character Lottie in episode one, "Perfect Woman", of series two of Man Down for Channel 4.

In 2016, Vickers played Cara in one episode of the British sitcom comedy Lovesick, produced by Clerkenwell Films and broadcast on Netflix. She also appeared that year as Leanne Randall through the six-episode third series of the BBC One crime drama Shetland. In the Netflix historical drama series The Crown, directed by Benjamin Caron, she performed in one 2016 episode as Crawfie.

In 2018, she appeared as Jane Gooding in one episode of The Alienist, directed by Jakob Verbruggen, for TNT-Netflix.

Beginning with the premiere on 20 October 2019, Vickers appeared as Ms. Crookshanks, a main character in HBO's Watchmen television series continuation of the 1986 DC Comics limited series of the same name.

Vickers appeared in four episodes of the 2021 second series and one episode of the 2023 third series of the Scottish crime drama, Guilt.

In April 2024, it was announced that Vickers had been cast as Davina Porter in the Outlander prequel series Outlander: Blood of My Blood.

=== Film ===
Vickers performed as Eilidh in Sunshine on Leith, a 2013 musical film directed by Dexter Fletcher.

She played Lizzie in Breaking, a 2016 short film directed by Saul Abraham and Joel Feder.

== Personal life ==
Vickers married the British actor and RADA classmate Kerr Logan in August 2017. They have two children.

== Filmography ==
=== Film ===
- A Woman in Winter (2006), as Student 1
- Sunshine on Leith (2013), as Eilidh
- Connect (2019), as Debbie

=== Television ===
Year	Title	Role	Notes
2003	The Book Group	Babysitter	Episode: "Research"
2005	Taggart	Angela Robertson	Episode: "A Death Foretold"
2012	Bert and Dickie	Margaret	Television film
2013	Privates	Connie Charles	5 episodes
2013–2023	Endeavour	Joan Thursday	26 episodes
2015	Man Down	Lottie	Episode: "Perfect Woman"
2015	The Scots at Waterloo	Jenny Griffiths	Television film
2016	Shetland	Leanne Randall	5 episodes
2016	The Crown	Marion Crawford	Episode: "Scientia Potentia Est"
2016	Lovesick	Cara	Episode: "Emma"
2018	The Alienist	Jane Gooding	Episode: "Silver Smile"
2019	Watchmen	Ms. Crookshanks	Main role
2021–2023	Guilt	Erin McKee	5 episodes
2025	Outlander: Blood of My Blood	Davina Porter	Renewed for second season June 2025
