= Caroline O'Neill =

English actress

Caroline O’Neill
- Born: 13 December 1961 (age 64); Blackpool, Lancashire, England
- Occupation: Actress
- Years active: 1984–present

Caroline O'Neill (born 13 December 1961) is an English television and theatre actress. She is best known for her role as Andrea Clayton in Coronation Street.

In a lengthy career, her television roles include Win Thursday in Endeavour, as well as an appearance in its sister programme Lewis, and as Janice Maloney in Queer as Folk. On stage, she appeared in the 2006 Royal Shakespeare Company revival of Arthur Miller’s The Crucible and in Peter Gill’s The York Realist.

== Television ==
- Coronation Street (29 episodes, 1985) as Andrea Clayton
- Grange Hill (4 episodes, 1991) as Susan
- Dead Romantic (TV Film, 1992) as Housewife
- Body & Soul (4 episodes, 1993) as Leila
- Chiller: Here Comes the Mirror Man (TV Film, 1995) as Estate agent
- A Touch of Frost (1 episode, 1997) as Maggie Hoxton
- Queer as Folk (9 episodes, 1999–2000) as Janice Maloney
- Coronation Street (11 episodes, 2000) as Andrea Clayton
- Waking the Dead (2 episodes, 2001) as Linsey Carr
- Coronation Street (1 episode, 2001) as Andrea Clayton
- EastEnders (3 episodes, 2002) as Clare Butcher
- Behind Closed Doors (2003) as Nikki Goodwin
- This Little Life (2003) as Nurse Babs
- Hear the Silence (2003) as Anna Hoskins
- Family Affairs (20 episodes, 2005) as Pam Hargreaves
- Jane Hall (6 episodes, 2006) as Karen Kershaw
- The New Worst Witch (26 episodes, 2005–2007) as Miss Hardbroom
- Mum’s Gone Gay (2007) as Mum
- Lewis (1 episode, 2008) as Susan Chapman
- The Execution of Gary Glitter (2009) as Kelly Andrews
- The Inbetweeners (1 episode, 2010) as Model's Mum
- Upstairs Downstairs (1 episode, 2010) as Mrs. Proude
- Whitechapel (2 episodes, 2012) as Trisha Ingall
- Lip Service (1 episode, 2012) as Caroline
- Inspector George Gently (1 episode, 2014) as Katherine Thomas
- Undeniable (1 episode, 2014) as Jo Haywood
- Happy Valley (1 episode, 2015) as Lynn Dewhurst
- Doc Martin (1 episode, 2015) as Alice Bell
- Unforgotten (1 episode, 2015) as Joanna Bridges
- Our Girl (1 episode, 2016) as Stella
- Last Tango in Halifax (2 episodes, 2016) as Janice
- Endeavour (34 episodes, 2013–2023) as Win Thursday
- The A Word (2020) as Pauline
- Doctors (2020, 2024) as Meryl Dibton / Patricia Bennett
- Sister Boniface Mysteries (2023) as Shirley Turner

== Theatre ==
- The Crucible (Royal Shakespeare Theatre & Gielgud Theatre, 2006) as Ann Putnam
- Honeymoon Suite (Royal Court Theatre, 2004) as Izzy
- A Day in Dull Armour (Royal Court Theatre, 2002) as Mother
- The York Realist (The Lowry, Bristol Old Vic, Royal Court Theatre and Strand Theatre, 2001–2002) as Barbara
- Vertigo (Theatre Royal, Windsor & Yvonne Arnaud Theatre, 1998–1999)
- Stranger’s House (Royal Court Theatre, 1997) as Nelly
- One More Wasted Year (Royal Court Theatre, 1997) as Waitress
- Watch Out for Mr Stork (Finborough Theatre & Regent's Park Open Air Theatre, 1995) as Karen
- And His Name Was Jim (Grove Theatre, London, 1991) as Carol
- The Increased Difficulty of Concentration (Old Red Lion Theatre, 1989)
- Blithe Spirit (Dundee Repertory Theatre, 1988)
- Soapbox (Wythenshawe Forum Theatre, 1988)
- The Importance of Being Earnest (Theatre Royal, Plymouth and tour, 1986) as Cecily
- Strippers (Harlow Playhouse and tour, 1986) as Michelle
- A Man for All Seasons (tour, 1984) as Margaret
- Romeo and Juliet (Newark Palace Theatre and tour, 1984) as Juliet

== Film ==
- Urban Hymn (2015) as Fiona
