= Sean Rigby =

English actor

- Born: 15 August 1989 (age 36); Preston, England
- Other name: Chubba
- Education: London Academy of Music and Dramatic Art
- Occupation: Actor
- Years active: 2012–present
- Spouse: Claire

Sean Rigby (born 15 August 1989) is a stage and television actor from Preston, Lancashire, England. He is best known for playing Jim Strange in Endeavour.

== Career ==
Rigby graduated from the London Academy of Music and Dramatic Art in 2012.

He is best known for his role as Police Constable, later Police Sergeant and Detective Sergeant Jim Strange in Endeavour, the prequel series to Inspector Morse, from its inception in 2012 to 2023. A New York Times reviewer said Rigby's interpretation of Strange "brings a vulpine grace" to the character.

In the 2017-aired British historical drama television mini-series, Gunpowder, Rigby played William Parker, 4th Baron Monteagle, who received a letter, maybe or maybe not self-penned, warning of the Gunpowder Plot.

In 2015, Rigby played the security guard Moe in a production of Alistair McDowall's Pomona at the National Theatre, Temporary Theatre, which had previously opened at the Orange Tree Theatre in Richmond in 2014. The show, which included Rigby as a security guard's "troubled accomplice", was reviewed in The Guardian by Michael Billington, who gave the production three stars. Henry Hitchings of the Evening Standard felt Rigby's character was "especially unsettling".

In 2015, Rigby appeared as Henry in a 13-minute short drama Isabella. In 2017, he starred as the only character in the four-minute short film, Crossing Seas.
