= Jack Laskey =

English actor

- Born: 1982 (age 43–44); Ipswich, Suffolk, England
- Education: Royal Academy of Dramatic Art
- Occupation: Actor
- Years active: 2007–present
- Father: Michael Laskey

Jack Laskey is an English actor best known for his theatre work and his role as DS Jakes in the ITV drama series Endeavour. He is the third son of Michael Laskey, a poet. Laskey trained at the Royal Academy of Dramatic Art (RADA).

== Television ==
Laskey played a recurring TV role as DS Peter Jakes in the ITV series Endeavour.

Between 2015 and 2017, Laskey played the role of Alfred Graves 'a young man with a gentle soul' who 'is burdened with an uncommon condition - synesthesia in the TV show X Company.

Other television credits include Squirrel Huntin' Sam McCoy in the Emmy Award-nominated Hatfields And McCoys, directed by Kevin Reynolds and Kevin Costner.

Laskey played the role of the Photographer in Joseph Pierce's animation A Family Portrait.

== Film ==
He made his film debut in 2011 as Carruthers in Guy Ritchie's Sherlock Holmes: A Game of Shadows.

Laskey played the lead role of Konrad in producer Peter Fudakowski's 2014 adaption of Joseph Conrad's short story The Secret Sharer. Almost half of the lines Laskey speaks in the film are in Mandarin - a language he had no previous knowledge of before starting work on the film.

In 2015 he appeared in the Julian Jarrold film A Royal Night Out, which starred Rupert Everett and Emily Watson.

== Theatre ==
With the Royal Shakespeare Company in 2008, he played Bassanio in Tim Carroll's The Merchant Of Venice; Biondello in The Taming Of The Shrew; and Robert Hooke in Riot Group co-founder Adriano Shaplin's The Tragedy Of Thomas Hobbes, directed by Elizabeth Freestone.

Laskey has played at Shakespeare's Globe theatre: he worked with artistic director Dominic Dromgoole on two productions, playing four characters in Trevor Griffiths's "A New World: A Life Of Thomas Paine" and Octavius Caesar in "Antony And Cleopatra"; for two seasons he played Bernard of Clairvaux in Howard Brenton's In Extremis, directed by John Dove; and in Thea Sharrock's 2009 production of "As You Like It". He received an Ian Charleson Award Commendation for his performance as Orlando.

He has toured internationally with the Young Vic theatre in two major productions: Luc Bondy's 2010 production of Schnitzler's "Sweet Nothings", in which he took the role of Theodore; and in 2011 he played The Other in Jon Fosse's two hander "I Am The Wind", Patrice Chéreau's only ever English language production.

In 2013 at the Arcola theatre, Laskey played the role of Platonov in Helena Kaut-Hausen's production of "Sons Without Fathers", which received a positive review from Michael Billington.

His early theatre credits include Romeo in Romeo and Juliet (English Theatre of Vienna), Cornelius/Reynaldo in Hamlet (Old Vic), Carney in Biloxi Blues (Couch Potato Productions), Juliet in an all-male production of Romeo and Juliet (Blood in the Alley), and Hamlet in Hamlet (Haymarket Theatre Basingstoke).

== Filmography ==
=== Film ===
Year	Title	Role	Notes
2011	The Isis	Thomas	Short
2011	Sherlock Holmes: A Game of Shadows	Caruthers	
2014	The Secret Sharer	Konrad	
2015	A Royal Night Out	Lieutenant Pryce	
2015	Star Wars: The Force Awakens	First Order Officer	
2019	The Aftermath	Wilkins	

=== Television ===
Year	Title	Role	Notes
2007	Heartbeat	Jez Flambard	Episode: Mind Games
2012	Halfields & McCoys	Squirrel-Huntin' Sam McCoy	2 episodes
2013–2016, 2023	Endeavour	DS Peter Jakes	10 episodes
2015-2017	X Company	Alfred Graves	28 episodes
2018	Trust	Dr. Mackenzie	3 episodes
2024	Une amitié dangereuse	Henry Rich 1st Earl of Holland	3 episodes
