= Jack Bannon (English actor) =

British actor

- Born: Norwich, England
- Occupation: Actor
- Years active: 2004–present

Jack Bannon is an English actor, known for his roles as Sam Thursday on the ITV drama series Endeavour (from 2013) and as Alfred Pennyworth on the Epix crime drama series Pennyworth (2019–2022).

== Early life and education ==
Jack Bannon grew up in Norwich.

He completed high school at Notre Dame High School before attending the arts course at the Theatre Royal.

== Career ==
In 2014 Bannon played Christopher Morcom, the best friend of Alan Turing (played by Benedict Cumberbatch), in the feature film The Imitation Game. In the same year, he featured in the American-British war film Fury.

He became widely known after he took the role of Sam Thursday on the ITV drama series Endeavour in 2013. He has also featured in the TV series Ripper Street (2012), The Loch (2017), and Clique (2017).

Bannon plays Alfred Pennyworth on the Epix crime drama series Pennyworth (2019–2022).

He plays Lukas, the new partner to Lena Olin's Detective Hulda Hermannsdóttir, in the Nordic Noir series set in Iceland, The Darkness. The series was released in Iceland in September 2024 before getting worldwide release. Bannon has also been announced by Prime Video as playing an as-yet-undisclosed role in its 2026 Tomb Raider television streaming series, alongside Sophie Turner as lead character Lara Croft.

== Filmography ==
=== Film ===
Year	Title	Role	Notes
2014	The Imitation Game	Christopher Morcom	
2014	Fury	Young Tanker	
2015	A Plea for Grimsby	Dan	Short film
2015	Figments	The Man	Short film
2016	Kids in Love	Felix	
2017	Tortilla	Chris Fader	Short film

=== Television ===
Year	Title	Role	Notes
2004	Shadow Play	Ben	Recurring role, 4 episodes
2005	The Giblet Boys	Scurvy	Series regular, 13 episodes
2013–2018, 2023	Endeavour	Sam Thursday	Recurring role, 10 episodes
2016	Ripper Street	Caleb Sumner	Episode: "All the Glittering Blades"
2017	Clique	James Buxton	Recurring role, 5 episodes
2017	The Loch	Kieran Whitehead	Series regular, 6 episodes
2018–2019	Medici	Angelo Poliziano	Series regular, 10 episodes
2019–2022	Pennyworth	Alfred Pennyworth	Series regular, 30 episodes
2024	The Darkness	Lukas	Series regular, 6 episodes
2025	Pulse	Tom Cole	Series regular, 10 episodes
2026	Babies	Dave	Series regular, 6 episodes
TBA	Tomb Raider	Gerry	Filming

== Theatre ==
Year	Title	Role	Venue	Notes
2013	Foxfinder	William	Gothenburg English Studio Theatre	
2015	The Sweethearts	Trevor	Finborough Theatre	
2017	Filthy Business	Gerard	Hampstead Theatre	
