= Peter Fudakowski =

English filmmaker (born 1954)

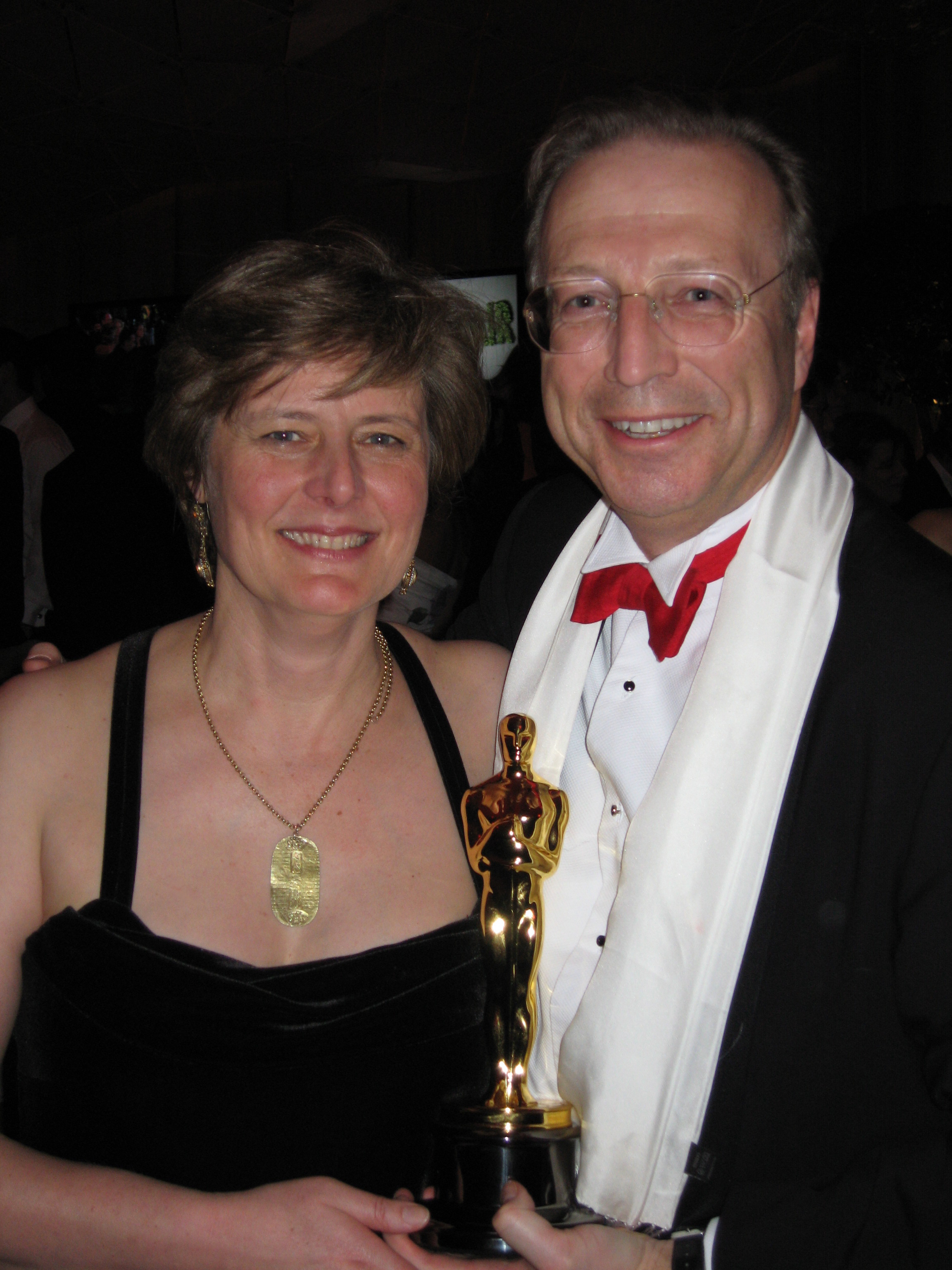
- Peter and his wife Henrietta at the Oscars in 2006
- Born: 2 September 1954 (age 72); London, England
- Education: Wimbledon College; Magdalene College, Cambridge
- Occupations: Film director; Screenwriter; Film Producer
- Years active: 1995–present
- Known for: Secret Sharer (film), Tsotsi
- Partner: Henrietta Fudakowski (1980–present)
- Children: 2

Peter Jan Fudakowski (born 2 September 1954) is a London-based film producer, writer and director.

== Early life ==
Fudakowski, born in London to Polish immigrants and educated at Wimbledon College, did not go to film school but studied economics at Magdalene College, Cambridge (where he was the President of the Cambridge Union Society in Michaelmas Term 1976). He graduated with a master's degree and later read for an MBA at the business school INSEAD, France.

== Career ==
In 1979 he joined the First National Bank of Chicago, where he worked in the film financing department. In 1982 Fudakowski left to set up his own production company with his wife, Henrietta Fudakowski (née Williams), as a script editor and head of development.

== Awards and accolades ==
Their company, Premiere Productions Ltd, marked its 20th year in the film business with the production of Tsotsi, which won an Oscar for Best Foreign Film in 2006. Peter was also nominated in 2006 by the BAFTA for an Outstanding Debut by a British Writer, Director or Producer Award.

Tsotsi won both the critics and Audience Awards at the Edinburgh Film Festival in 2005. This was followed by winning the People's Choice Award for Best Film at the Toronto International Film Festival in 2005. Tsotsi was also nominated in 2006 for a BAFTA Award for Best Film Not in the English Language and a Golden Globe Award for Best Foreign Language Film.

Following this Fudakowski and Williams developed film projects, including The Secret Sharer and Corams Children. Fudakowski directed Secret Sharer, shot on location in Thailand and China, which was released in the UK in June 2014. In November 2014 Fudakowski was awarded the Wings Award by the Polish Film Festival in America.

== Family and ancestors ==
Peter Fudakowski is son of Wojciech and Danuta Fudakowski who escaped form Communist Poland to England just after WW2. Wojciech fought with the Polish resistance Armia Krajowa (AK) as a teenager. His wife Danuta as a 13-year-old girl, survived the Warsaw Uprising in August 1944. His grandfather Jan Fudakowski was a Polish officer, author of military memoirs and was also the inspiration for Jasiu – a character in Thomas Mann's novella Death in Venice. Peter Fudakowski has a son and a daughter from his marriage to Henrietta Fudakowski (née Henrietta Williams).

== Personal life ==
Peter is passionate about movies, photography, ski-touring and sailing. He enjoys traveling and spending time with his grandchildren. In 1995 he helped set up the Mountain Haven for sick children in southern Poland under the auspices of the UK charity Children in Crisis. The Haven had achieved its goals by 2010 and was taken over by Caritas Poland.

Films
Year	Title	Director	Producer	Notes
1995	Prowokator	No	Associate	https://www.imdb.com/title/tt0114198/
1999	The Last September	No	Executive	https://www.imdb.com/title/tt0180793/fullcredits/?ref_=tt_cl_sm
2003	Bugs 3D!	No	Executive	https://www.imdb.com/title/tt0337587/?ref_=nv_sr_srsg_0_tt_6_nm_0_q_BUGS%25203D!
2004	Piccadilly Jim	No	Associate	https://www.imdb.com/title/tt0371878/fullcredits/?ref_=tt_cl_sm
2004	In my Country	No	Associate	https://www.imdb.com/title/tt0349260/fullcredits/?ref_=tt_cl_sm
2005	Tsotsi	No	Yes	
2005	Keeping Mum	No	Executive	
2011	Hysteria	No	Executive	
2014	Secret Sharer	Yes	Yes	Scriptwriter adapted from the book Secret Sharer
2023	Twarze Agaty	No	Co-Producer	https://www.imdb.com/title/tt28328696/?ref_=ext_shr_wts

Television Series
Year	Title	Director	Producer	Notes
1999	Trial by Fire	No	Executive	https://www.imdb.com/title/tt0245518/?ref_=nm_flmg_t_9_dr
2002	Helen West	No	Executive	https://www.imdb.com/title/tt0318221/fullcredits/?ref_=tt_cl_sm
