= HSBC Building =

Several buildings carry the HSBC name, and some are often referred to as HSBC Building, HSBC Tower or both:

== Building ==
- HSBC Building (Hong Kong) – 1 Queen's Road Central, Victoria City, Hong Kong
- HSBC Building Mongkok – 673 Nathan Road, Kowloon, Hong Kong
- HSBC Building, the Bund – neo-classical landmark on The Bund, Shanghai, China
- HSBC Building (Penang) – George Town, Penang, Malaysia
- HSBC Building (Sungai Petani) – Sungai Petani, Kedah, Malaysia
- Hongkong and Shanghai Bank Building, Ipoh – Ipoh, Perak, Malaysia
- HSBC Canada Building – Vancouver, British Columbia, Canada
- Marine Midland Building – 140 Broadway, New York City, US (also called HSBC Building)
- One Centenary Square – Birmingham, United Kingdom – headquarters of HSBC UK

== Tower ==
- Menara IQ – Tun Razak Exchange, Kuala Lumpur, Malaysia
- HSBC Tower, Lima – twenty-six-floor tower in San Isidro, Lima, Peru
- HSBC Tower, London – 8 Canada Square, in the Canary Wharf development, Isle of Dogs, London, UK
- HSBC Tower, Shanghai – Forty-six-floor tower in Lujiazui, Pudong, Shanghai, China
- HSBC Tower, Mexico City – Paseo de la Reforma, Mexico City, Mexico
- HSBC Tower, Midtown Manhattan (USA Headquarters) – 452 Fifth Ave., Manhattan, New York City, US

== Other ==
- HSBC Arena (Buffalo) – Buffalo, New York, US
- HSBC Arena (Rio de Janeiro) – Rio de Janeiro, Brazil
- HSBC Centre – Kowloon, Hong Kong
- HSBC GLT India – Global Technology Center in Pune, India
- HSBC Tower – 188 Quay Street, Auckland, New Zealand
- One HSBC Center – Buffalo, New York, US
- One HSBC Plaza – Rochester, New York, US
- One HSBC Plaza – Binghamton, New York, US
