= David McLeod Craik =

British Royal Engineers officer and architect

David McLeod Craik (D. McLeod Craik)
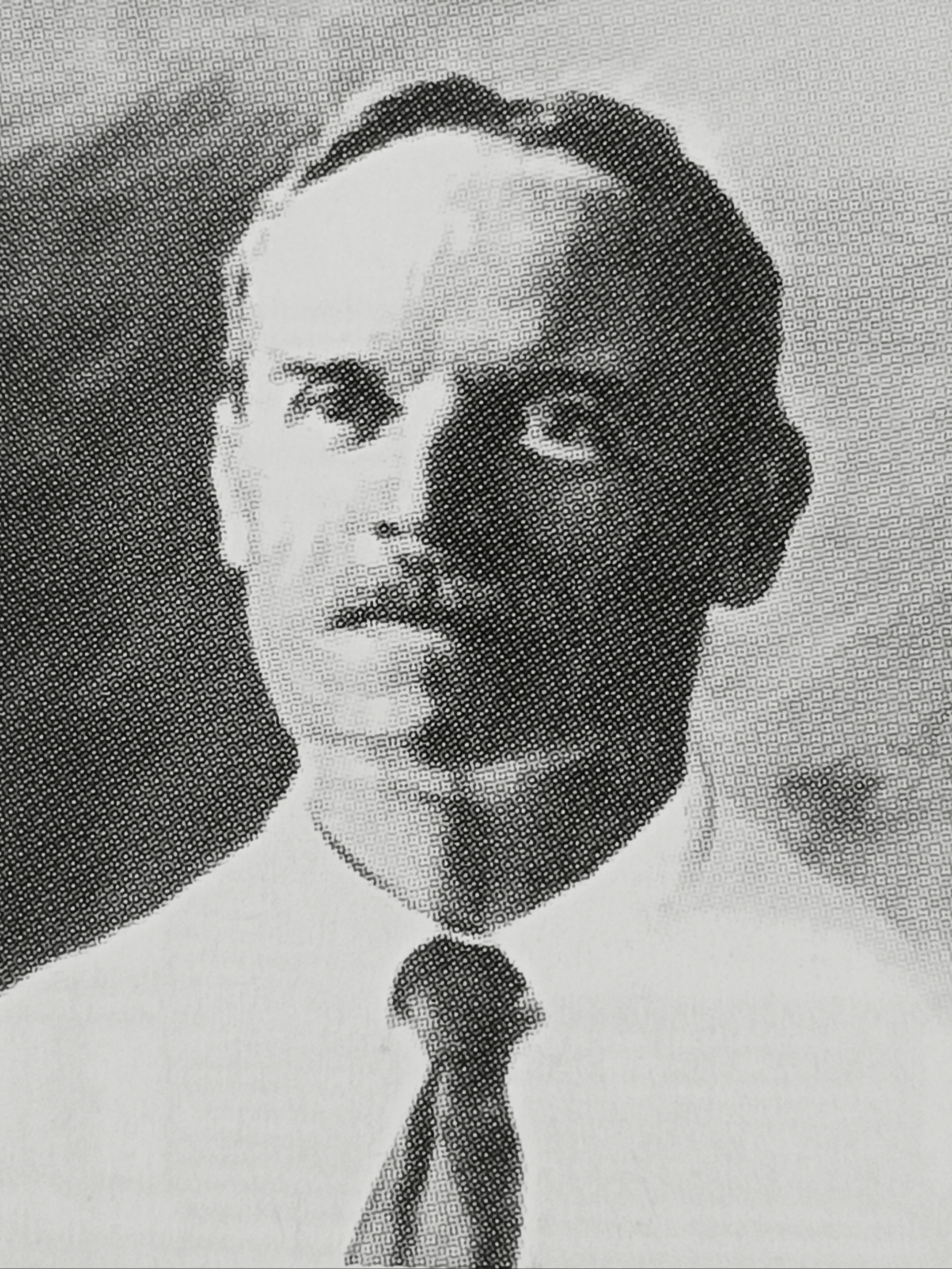
- Born: 1873; Neath, Glamorganshire, Wales
- Died: 1 August 1938 (aged 65); George Town, Penang, Straits Settlements
- Burial place: Western Road Cemetery, Penang, Malaysia
- Occupation: Architect
- Spouse: Grace Black
- Children: 4
- Practice: Swan & Maclaren (1913–1923); Swan, Maclaren & Craik (1923–1928); Craik & Leicester (1928–1932)

David McLeod Craik FRIBA (1873–1 August 1938) was a Royal Engineers officer and architect noted for his works in the Straits Settlements. He was the oldest practising architect in the colony at the time of his death.

== Early life ==
David McLeod Craik was born in 1873 at Neath, Glamorganshire, the second son of Robert Craik, a Scottish travelling draper and his Welsh wife Kate McLeod. He spent the early part of his childhood in the Stewartry and later removed with his parents to Swansea where he received his education.

== Architectural career ==
=== United Kingdom ===
After leaving school at the age of 16, Craik was articled to Bucknall & Jennings of Swansea between 1889 and 1893. Afterwards, he served as assistant to Clarke & Bell and Thomas Lennox Watson in Glasgow and to William Hamilton Beattie in Edinburgh from 1894 until 1896, when he passed his examination as Student RIBA. After that he moved to the office of Robert Graeme Watt and Frederick Henry Tullock in Belfast from which he found employment with John McKean Brydon in 1898, working on the Government Offices Great George Street at Whitehall. Craik remained with him until March 1900, when he passed the qualifying exam and was admitted ARIBA, his proposers being Brydon, Watson and Cole Alfred Adams. Thereafter he became a senior assistant with Edward Augustus Grunning until 1902.

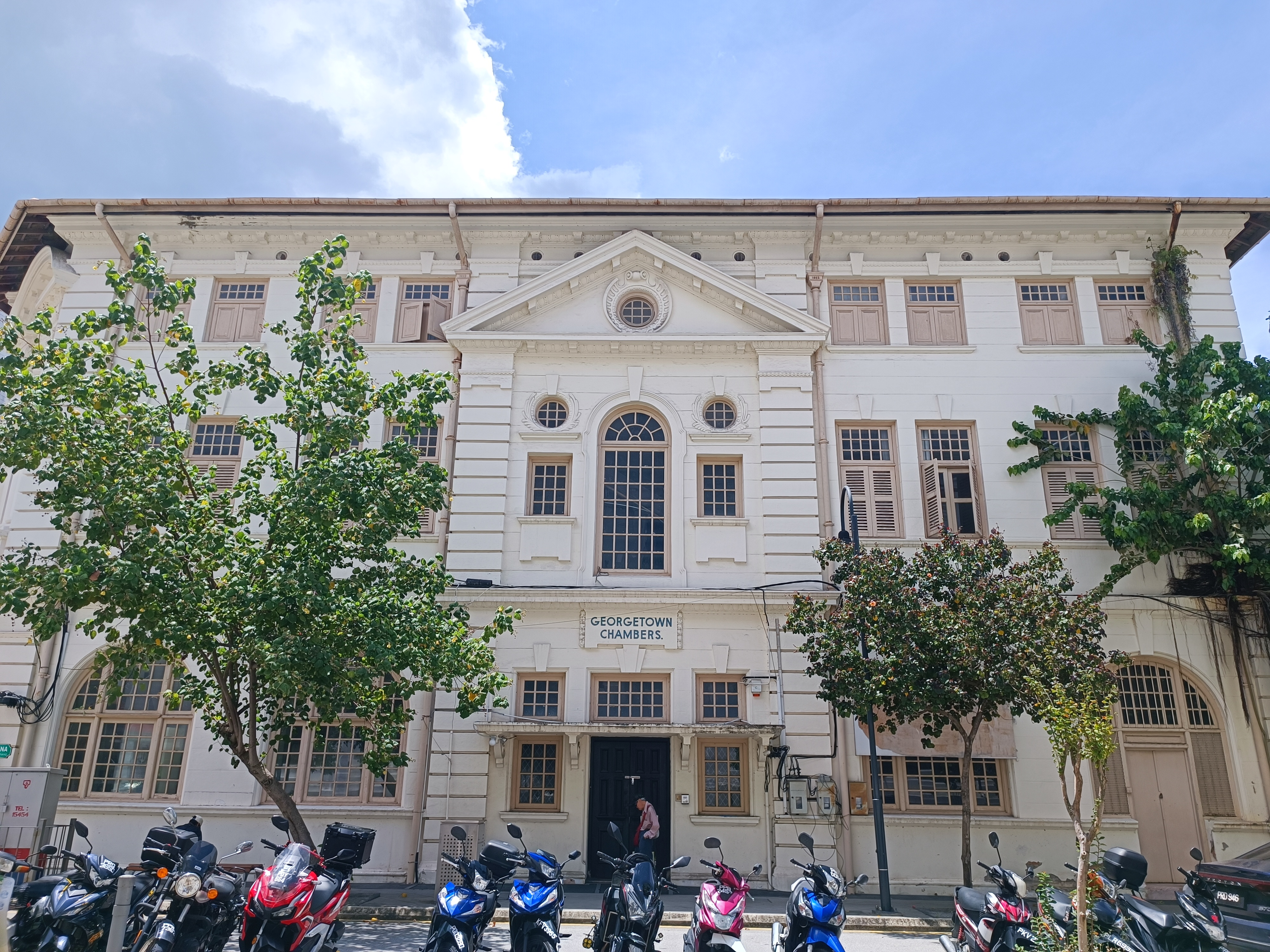
The George Town Chambers

=== Straits Settlements ===
Craik obtained a post in 1902 as first architectural assistant to the Singapore municipality in the Straits Settlements. During his time as municipal architect he designed the Jinrikisha Station at Kreta Ayer and the entrance lodge, gate and chapel of the Bidadari Cemetery. He remained in the post for about five years, when he resigned and started his own practice in 1907. In the same year, he had secured the largest job of the period as designer of Alkaff Arcade at Collyer Quay for Alkaff & Co.. Other major buildings by him at that period were the Wesley Methodist Episcopal Church, St. Joseph's Cathedral and the Masonic Hall in Coleman Street.

On 1 December 1912 he merged his practice with the Singaporean firm of Swan & Maclaren. On 12 January 1914 he was admitted FRIBA, then at 26 May of the same year, he took his first ever home leave, but arrived in the UK just a month before World War I was declared. He served in the war as a Royal Engineers officer until he was demobilised in August 1919.

Upon his return to the Straits, he was sent to Penang to open a branch office for Swan & Maclaren. On the death of Philip Charles Russell, the firm's partner, the name of the Penang branch was changed to Swan, Maclaren & Craik. His notable works while in the partnership were Eu Villa in Singapore, Loke Villa and George Town Dispensary in Penang, and the HSBC building in Sungai Petani.

In 1929 Craik ceded from Swan, Maclaren & Craik and subsequently formed a partnership with Osborne Howard Leicester, formerly an architectural assistant with the Penang municipality. Craik & Leicester took up office at the George Town Chambers, which is a part of the George Town Dispensary building. Works during this period were all in Penang, including The Cenotaph, Lim Lean Teng Mansions and The Windsor. The firm included an assistant architect, Sidney Iverson Knowles, but his services were terminated during the building slump. He was found shot dead on 13 April 1932 and an inquest by a state coroner concluded that Knowles had committed suicide. He left behind three letters, one of them addressed to Craik.

Due to the recession, the partnership of Craik & Leicester ceased by 1932, Craik then went solo under the style of Craik, D. McLeod, Chartered Architect, meanwhile Leicester returned to London where he started a private practice. Craik passed away while still in practice in 1938, making him the longest practicing architect in the Straits Settlements before World War II.

== Military service ==
=== Volunteer service ===
Craik was one of the original members of the Singapore Royal Engineers (Volunteers) or SRE (V) and designed badges and buttons for that unit in which he served from 1902 to 1921 when the Volunteer force was reconstructed. He retired from SRE (V) with the rank of lieutenant and joined the Volunteer Corps in Penang as a private. He retired from military service altogether in 1925 with the Long Service Medal.

=== War service ===
When World War I broke out, Craik reported for duty as lieutenant of the Royal Engineers on 9 September 1914 at Brompton Barracks. He then trained and took the 145th Army Troops Company, R.E. to France in September 1915 and commanded the company until he was badly wounded at the end of November 1917, losing 2 fingers of his right hand in the process. After leaving hospital he took up command of the 566th Wiltshire Territorial Company, R.E. at Worgret Camp, Wareham until after the Armistice. He retired with the rank of Captain, R.E. and was demobilised in August 1919 in Singapore.

== Personal life ==
=== Family ===
Craik married Grace Black, a nurse and veteran of the South African War, at St. George's Church on 12 December 1908. They had four children: three daughters and a son. Their second daughter, Catherine McLeod Craik, died at the age of 7½ months while she was at sea en route from Penang to Singapore on 26 August 1911. She was memorialised by a stained glass depicting St. Catherine of Alexandria at St. Joseph's Cathedral.

On 20 May 1938 Grace died after a long illness at a nursing home in London. Their only son, Donald McLeod RAF VR ARIBA, was killed in action during World War II on 24 March 1942.

=== Death ===
Before his death, Craik had not been in the best of his health for about a month. Some days later he developed a chill and then was admitted to the General Hospital. He died at the hospital on 1 August 1938, at the age of 65. His funeral and burial was commenced at the Western Road Cemetery in Penang.

== Works ==
Craik worked on the following buildings:

Name	Image	Location	Date constructed	Status	Notes	References
Government Offices Great George Street		Westminster, London	1908–1917	Extant	Designed by J. M. Brydon, assisted by Craik from 1898 to 1900.	
Jinrikisha Station		Tanjong Pagar, Singapore	1903	Extant		
Entrance lodge, gate and chapel for Bidadari Cemetery		Bidadari, Singapore	1908	Demolished, partially relocated	All graves were exhumed in 2006 to make way for the Bidadari housing estate, the entrance gates were relocated to Bidadari Garden, which was integrated into Bidadari Park in 2025.	
Wesley Methodist Church		Fort Canning Hill, Singapore	1908	Extant		
Alkaff Arcade		Collyer Quay, Singapore	1909	Demolished	Demolished in 1978 for a new 20-storey retail-cum-office building.	
Masonic Hall		Civic District, Singapore	1912	Extant	Designed by Thomas A. Cargill, Craik rebuilt the building's frontage facing Coleman Street.	
St. Joseph's Church		Rochor, Singapore	1912	Extant	Initial design by G. A. Fernandez, alterations by Craik.	
2 Cable Road		Tanglin, Singapore	1913	Extant		
Seri Teratai		George Town, Penang	1919	Extant	credited to Henry Alfred Neubronner, design signed by Craik.	
Bungalow for HSBC		George Town, Penang	1920	Demolished		
Three bungalows for Mark Kingsley Whitlock		George Town, Penang	1920s	Demolished		
Bungalow for Mansfield & Co.		George Town, Penang	1920s	Demolished		
United Engineers building		George Town, Penang	1922	Extant	Currently occupied by Public Bank.	
HSBC building		Sungai Petani, Kedah	1922	Extant		
George Town Dispensary building		George Town, Penang	1923	Extant		
Claremont		Penang Hill, Penang	1921–1923	Extant		
Loke Villa		George Town, Penang	1923	Extant		
New clubhouse for Penang Swimming Club		George Town, Penang	1924	Unknown	Designed by R.M. Love, assisted by Craik.	
St. Joseph's Novitiate and baroque chapel		George Town, Penang	1925	Extant, modified	Partially incorporated into Gurney Paragon.	
Moycraik		Penang Hill, Penang	1926	Extant	Craik's residence in Penang.	
Fairmont		Penang Hill, Penang	1926	Extant		
Grace Dieu		Penang Hill, Penang	1927	Extant		
The Cenotaph		George Town, Penang	1929	Destroyed, reconstructed	Destroyed during World War II in 1941, rebuilt by Charles Geoffery Boutcher in 1948.	
Godowns for Henry Waugh & Co. and Paterson, Simons & Co.		George Town, Penang	1930s	Extant	Now a part of the Rice Miller residential-cum-retail complex.	
Lim Lean Teng Mansions		George Town, Penang	1931	Extant		
Renovations of Suffolk House for the Anglo-Chinese High School		George Town, Penang	1931	Extant		
The Windsor		George Town, Penang	1934	Demolished	Redesigned with an Art Deco facade when occupied by Capitol Theatre, demolished in 1992 to make way for Komtar.	
French Bank at Raffles Place		Raffles Place, Singapore	Unknown	Unknown		
Crosby Hall		George Town, Penang	Unknown	Extant	Currently occupied by DISTED College.	
Rebuilding of Chatsworth for Alan Loke Wan Wye		George Town, Penang	Unknown	Unknown		
New extension for the Anglo-Chinese Girls' School		George Town, Penang	Unknown	Unknown		
K.K.S. Bank		Penang	Unknown	Unknown		
Tamil Methodist Church		Penang	Unknown	Unknown		

== Style ==
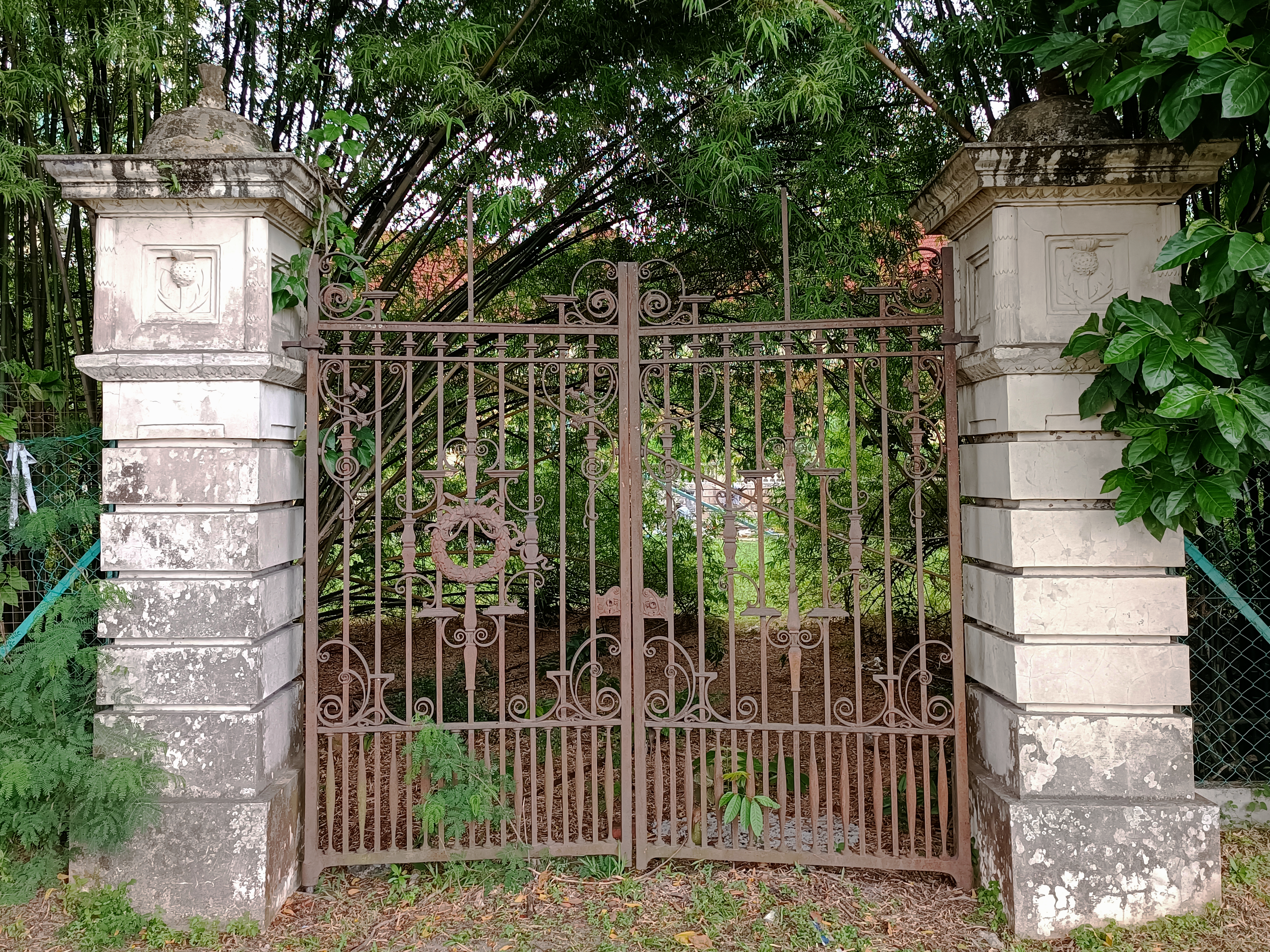
The seaward gate of Loke Villa with Scottish thistle motifs.

David Craik's signature style is characterised as a mix of Romanticism and cottage orné with strong overtones of the Scottish Arts and Crafts movement. His buildings are often topped with a pyramidal or hipped roof with terracotta finials. Craik embellished his homes with a cornucopia of naturalistic Arts and Crafts, Tudor, and Art Nouveau motifs. His architectural creations often feature his insignia, the Scottish thistle.

== Honours ==
- 1900 Associate of the Royal Institute of British Architects
- 1914 Fellow of the Royal Institute of British Architects
- 1920 1914–15 Star
- 1921 British War Medal
- 1921 Victory Medal
- 1925 Colonial Auxiliary Forces Long Service Medal
- 1929–30 Chieftain of the St. Andrew's Society of Penang
