= The Cenotaph, Penang =

War memorial in George Town, Penang, Malaysia

The Cenotaph
- Tugu Peringatan (Malay)
- George Town
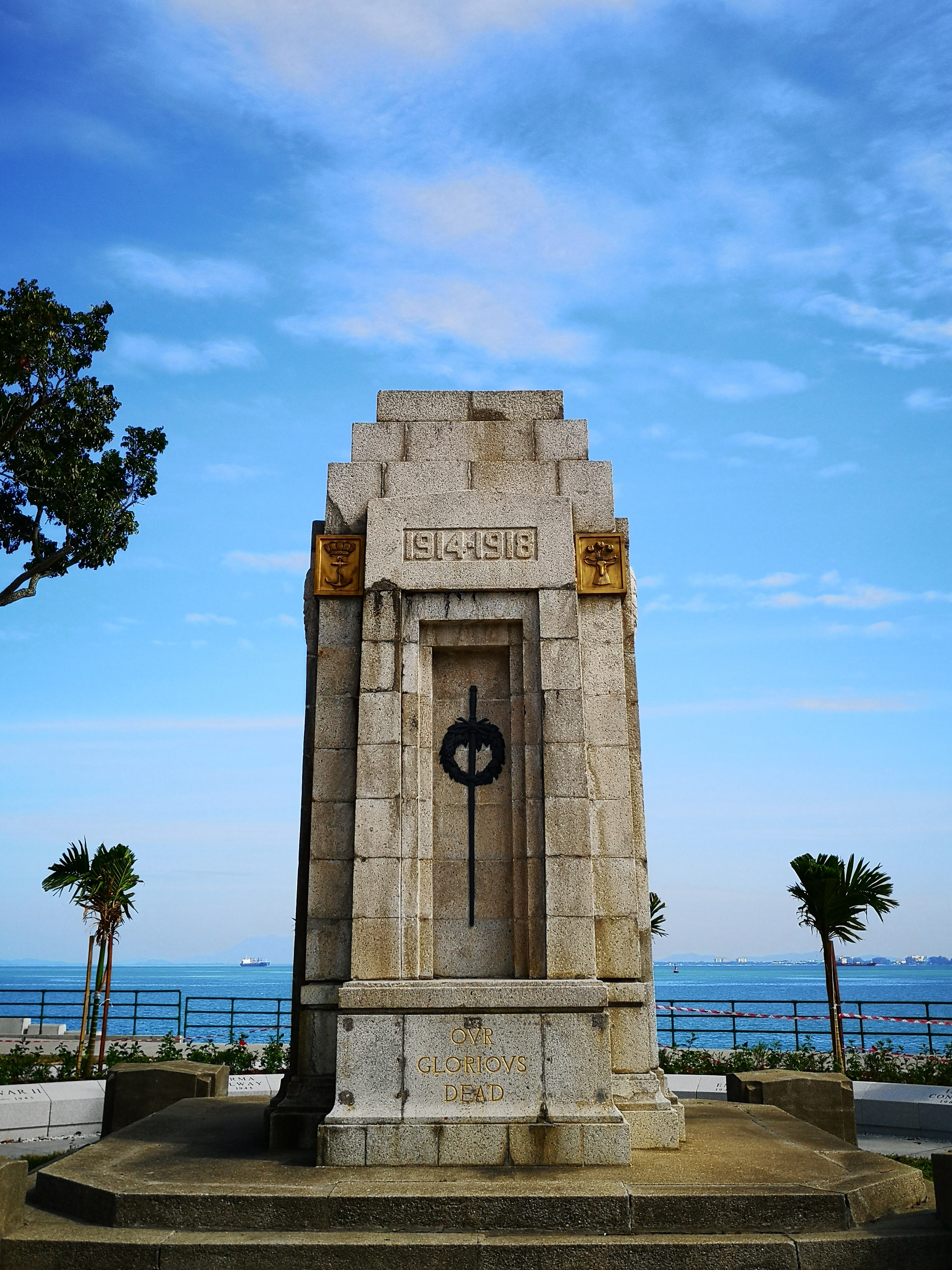
- For the Commonwealth dead of World War I, World War II, the Siam–Burma Death Railway, the Malayan Emergency, the Indonesia–Malaysia confrontation and the Second Malayan Emergency.
- Unveiled: 1929; 1948 (reconstruction)
- Location: 5°25′21″N 100°20′30″E; Esplanade, George Town, Penang
- Designed by: David McLeod Craik of Swan & Maclaren (original); Charles Geoffrey Boutcher of Stark & McNeill (reconstruction)
- 1914-1918; OUR GLORIOUS DEAD

UNESCO World Heritage Site
- Type: Cultural
- Criteria: ii, iii, iv
- Designated: 2008 (32nd session)
- Part of: George Town UNESCO Core Zone
- Reference no.: 1223
- Region: Asia-Pacific

The Cenotaph is a war memorial in George Town within the Malaysian state of Penang. Constructed in 1929, the memorial commemorates Allied servicemen who lost their lives during World War I. Located at the city's Esplanade, it serves as a venue for Remembrance Day ceremonies.

== History ==
=== Construction and dedication ===
In 1928, a war memorial dedicated to the casualties of World War I was proposed by G. D. A. Fletcher, chairman of the Ex-Services Association of Malaya (Penang branch), during a meeting of the association. The organisation aimed to have the memorial completed by Armistice Day that same year.

The war memorial was funded through public subscriptions, donations, and events such as operas and balls. Initial estimates for the memorial's cost were $7,000 (Straits dollar), but expenses increased to $10,000 due to higher than expected ornamental costs. Ultimately, the total amount needed reached $12,000. Fundraising was slow and the total collected amounted to $12,513.52, with additional interest of $64.24, only covering the costs after the memorial's construction.

The Cenotaph's base was completed in time for the foundation stone ceremony on 11 November 1928, marking the 10th anniversary of the armistice. Penang's Resident Councillor Meadows Frost officiated by lowering the stone using a pulley. The ceremony included the "Last Post", a two-minute silence at 11 am, the "Reveille" and wreath laying. A wooden model of the Cenotaph was displayed behind the base for public viewing.

Despite delays in the delivery of bronze decorations, the Cenotaph was completed for its unveiling on Armistice Day in 1929. Meadows Frost officiated the ceremony, which began at 10:25 a.m. with a military parade. After Frost unveiled the shrouded Cenotaph, the "Last Post" was sounded, followed by the firing of a rocket to mark the start of a two-minute silence and a second rocket to signal the "Reveille". Wreaths were laid for 15 minutes by public representatives, including an Italian in Blackshirt attire who gave the Fascist salute. The ceremony concluded with "God Save the King".

=== Destruction ===
In January 1945, during the Japanese occupation of Malaya, the Cenotaph was destroyed by Allied aerial bombardment. To avert the sudden collapse of the badly damaged Cenotaph, the Japanese undertook a systematic block by block demolition. A total of 184 intact dressed granite blocks and all of the bronze decorations were dismantled and kept in storage for future reconstruction. Following the British recapture of Penang, a flagstaff was temporarily placed at the spot where the Cenotaph once stood for Remembrance Day observances in 1946 and 1947.

=== Reconstruction ===
In 1948, the Ex-Services Association of Malaya (Penang Branch), led by chairman W. I. Legg, petitioned the Malayan Union government to rebuild the Cenotaph. The government was unwilling to finance the reconstruction, forcing the association to bear its full cost. Designed by Charles Geoffrey Boutcher, the new cenotaph had a slightly altered appearance from the original since it was constructed using the remaining granite blocks that were available. The Cenotaph was rebuilt at a cost of $3,500 (Malayan dollar) and unveiled on Remembrance Sunday in 1948.

=== Present ===
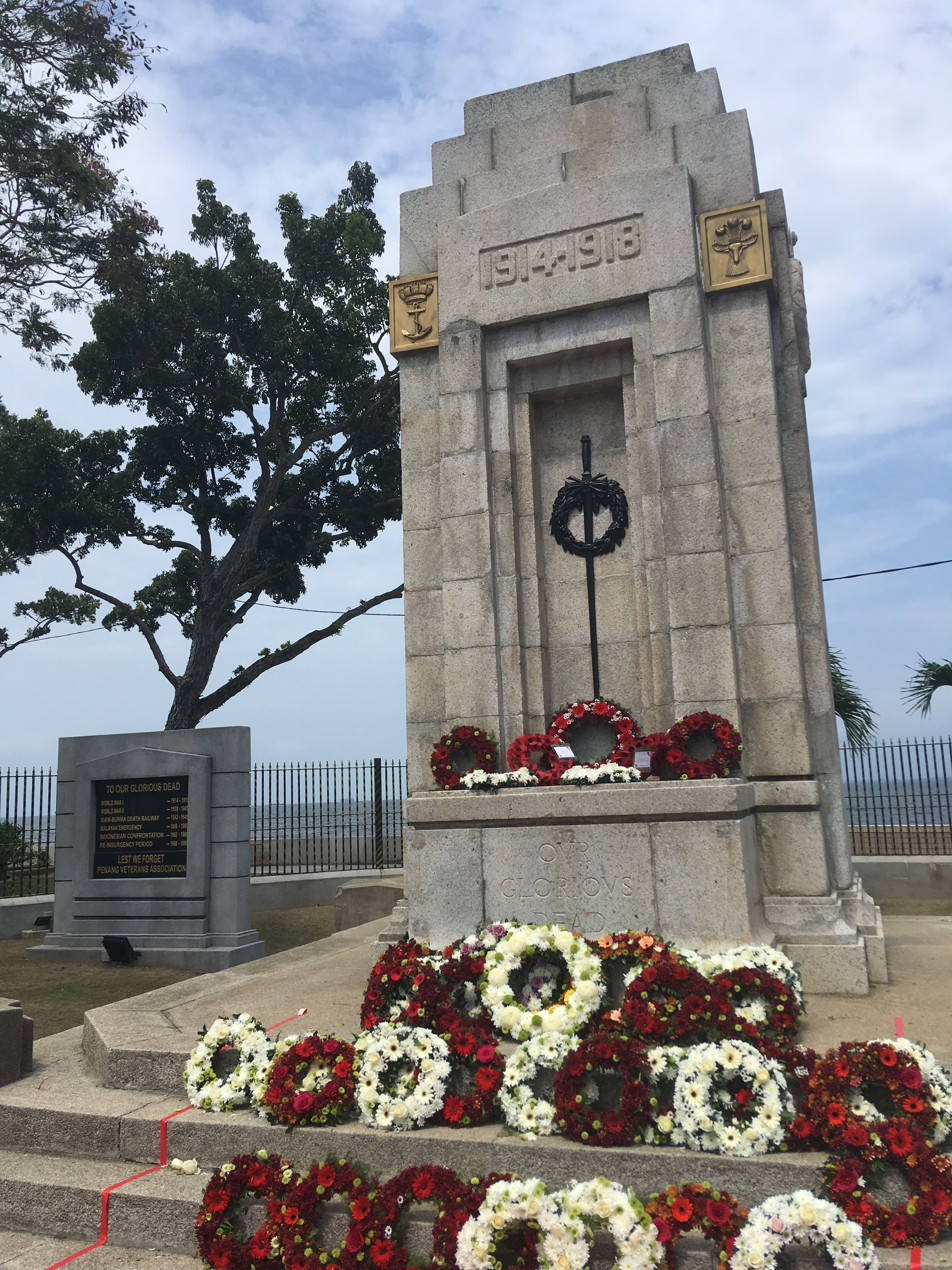
The reconstructed Cenotaph in 2018. On the left is the old memorial plaque erected by the Penang Veteran's Association.

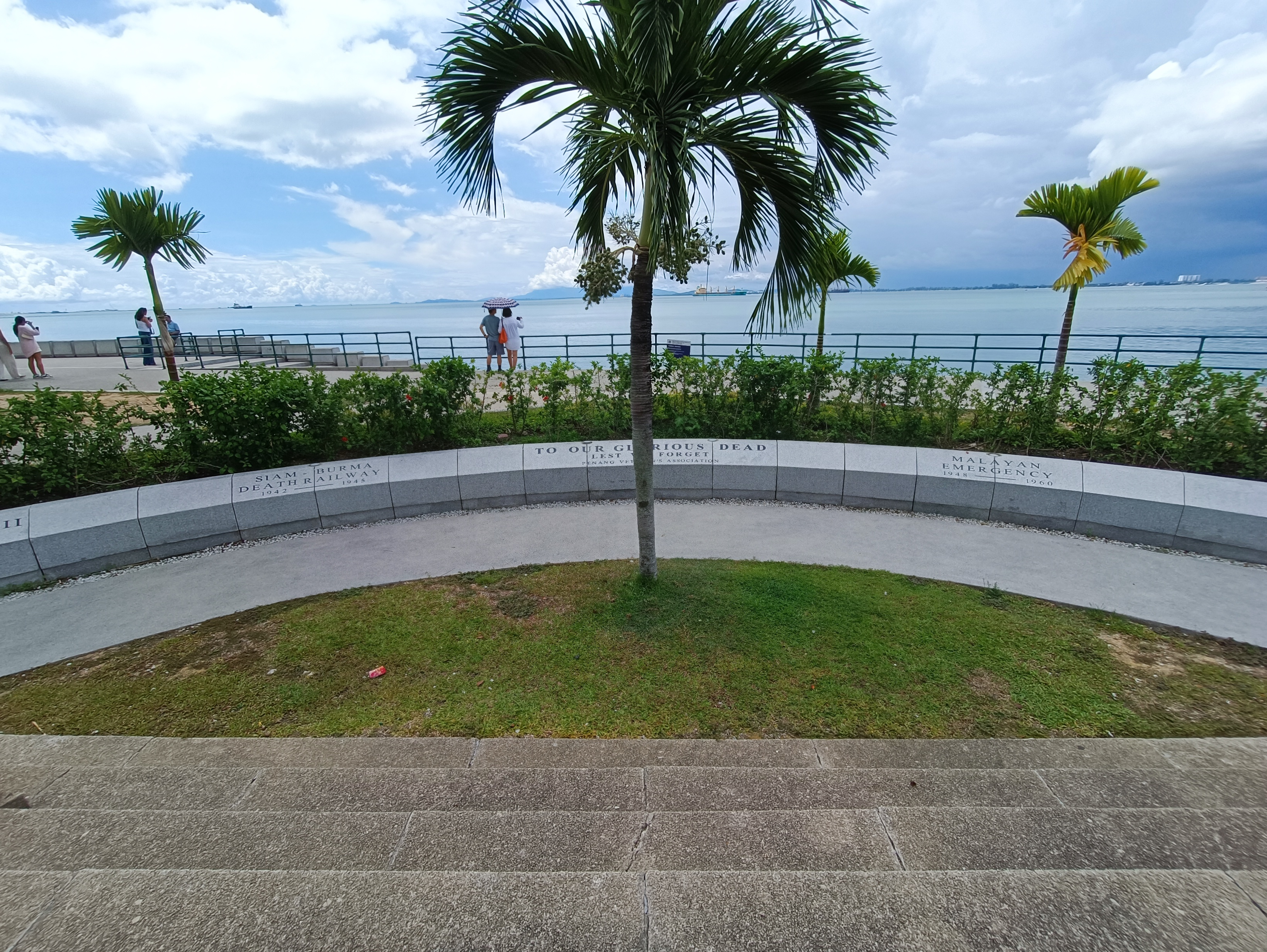
The new arc-shaped plaque by the Penang Veteran's Association in 2025.

In 2008, the Penang Island City Council initiated a restoration project for the Cenotaph, costing RM144,567. In addition, the Penang Veteran's Association erected a memorial plaque to commemorate those killed in later conflicts in Malaysia.

In 2023, the Esplanade seafront promenade underwent redevelopment into a linear garden as part of the North Seafront Masterplan. During this transformation, the iron fences surrounding the Cenotaph were removed to enhance public access. The memorial plaque from the Penang Veteran's Association was replaced with an arc-shaped plaque positioned behind the Cenotaph. The redevelopment began in May 2023 and was completed by December that year.

== Design ==
Closeup of the bronze sword and laurel wreath.

=== Original ===
The original Cenotaph was designed by architect David McLeod Craik of the firm Craik and Leicester. It was situated at the north corner of the Esplanade field (Padang), facing Fort Cornwallis. The structure was 8 by 20 feet high slightly tapered, flanked on three sides by plain panels with a niche and a Stone of Remembrance in front. The Cenotaph was raised on a platform 30 by 26 by 3 feet high approached by five steps with low pedestals at each corner: the total height being about 25 feet above road level. The bronzes on the Cenotaph consisted of a sword and laurel wreath in the niche, a massive wreath with Flanders poppies fixed to the Stone of Remembrance, and four corner plaques bearing the badges of the Navy, Army, Air Force and Mercantile Marine in high relief. These plaques face the front and back of the Cenotaph and show at the sides scenes typical of each of these four services, executed in low relief. Provisions had been made for four flags to be hung at the corners, consisting of the Union Jack, and White, Red and Blue ensigns on poles ornamented with bronze spear heads, cords and tassels. A footpath extends around the platform and form a circular path.

==== Inscription ====
There were two inscriptions on the Cenotaph. The words on top of the niche was "1914-1918", while the words at the front of the Stone of Remembrance was "OUR GLORIOUS DEAD". The intended inscription on the Stone of Remembrance was initially "PAX", but it was changed after the Ex-Services Association deemed it inappropriate. No roll of honour was written, owing to difficulties of obtaining names of the war dead. Thus, a back panel under the crown of laurel on the Cenotaph were placed for future inscription of names.

==== Material and construction ====
The Cenotaph and the raised platform it sat on was made of granite sourced from Penang. The granite carvings were carried out by Yeo Kim Eng. Bronzes of the Cenotaph were designed and executed by Adrian Stokes & Co. in London, whilst United Engineers Ltd. in Penang cast the bronze spear heads, cups and rings for the flag poles. The latter also assisted with fixing of the bronze work on the Cenotaph. The bricks used for the inner core of the Cenotaph were supplied by Borneo Co. Ltd. free of charge. The erection of the Cenotaph was carried out by contractors Pin & Co. at cost price.

=== Reconstruction ===
After the Cenotaph was destroyed in World War II, the Penang Ex-Servicemen Association decided to rebuild it in 1948. The architect Charles Geoffrey Boutcher of Boutcher & Co. agreed to design the new Cenotaph for free. The new Cenotaph was reconstructed using the remaining granite blocks and bronze ornaments of the original Cenotaph, resulting in slight deviations from its original design. The steps were rebuilt with precast concrete slabs instead of granite slabs to reduce costs. The orientation of the new Cenotaph is different than the original, which now faces Esplanade Road (Jalan Padang Kota Lama).

Full view of the Cenotaph in May 2025.

== See also ==
- Ayer Itam War Memorial Park
