= Azizi Mosque =

Mosque in Langkat, North Sumatra, Indonesia

- Masjid Azizi
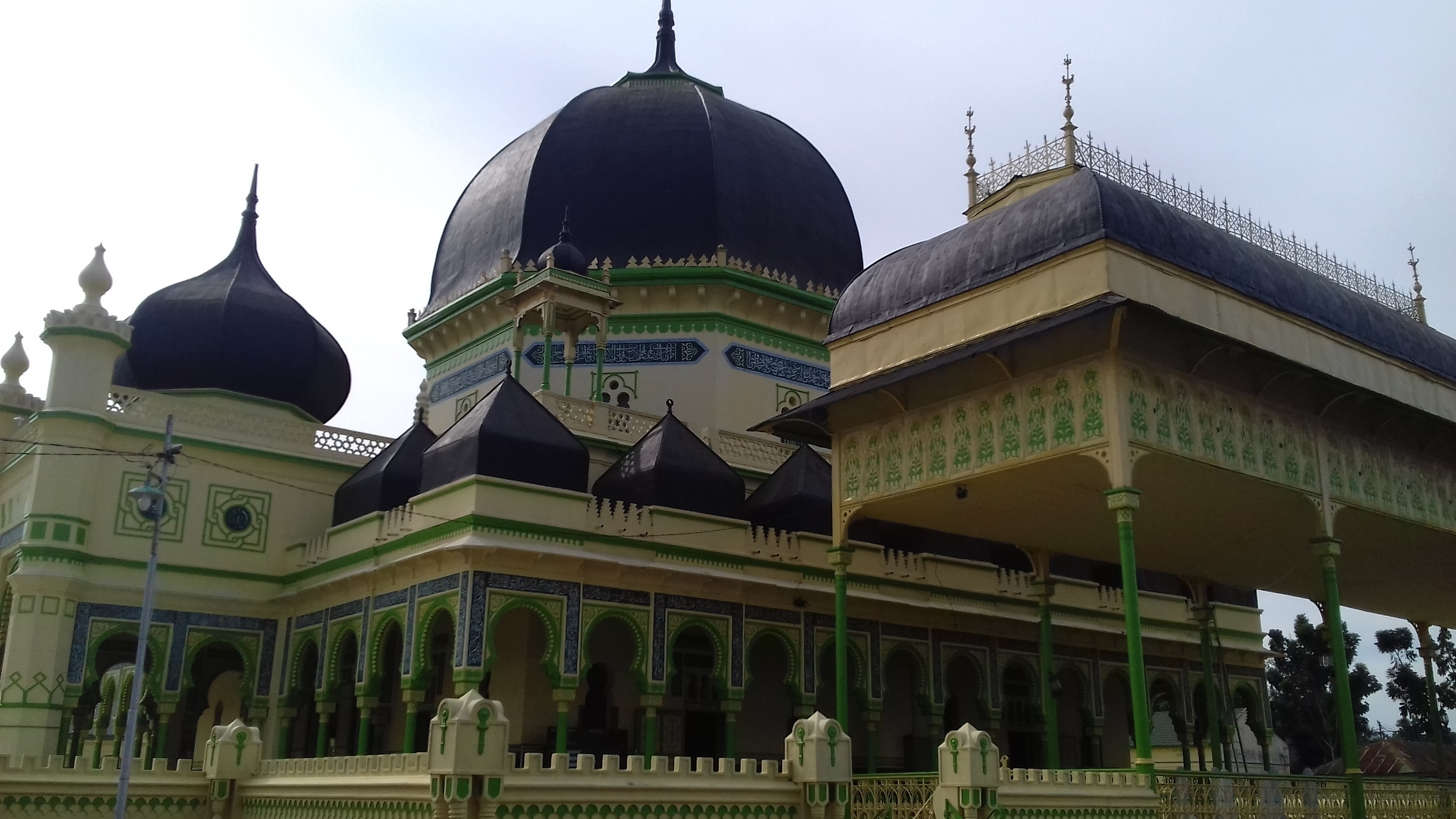

- Location of the mosque in Sumatra

Religion
- Affiliation: Islam
- Branch/tradition: Sunni
- Ecclesiastical or organizational status: Mosque
- Status: Active

Location
- Location: Tanjung Pura, North Sumatra
- Country: Indonesia
- Interactive map of Azizi Mosque
- Coordinates: 3°53′29″N 98°25′26″E

Architecture
- Type: Mosque architecture
- Style: Eclectic Mughal
- Groundbreaking: 1899
- Completed: 1902
- Construction cost: 200,000 ringgit

Specifications
- Direction of façade: East
- Capacity: 2,000 worshipers
- Length: 25 m (82 ft)
- Width: 25 m (82 ft)
- Height (max): 30 m (98 ft)
- Dome: 21; 4 main domes
- Dome height (outer): 20 m (66 ft)
- Minaret: 1
- Minaret height: 60 m (200 ft)
- Site area: 3 ha (7.4 acres)

The Azizi Mosque is a mosque located in Tanjung Pura, in the Langkat Regency of North Sumatra, Indonesia. It was the royal mosque of the Sultanate of Langkat.

== History ==
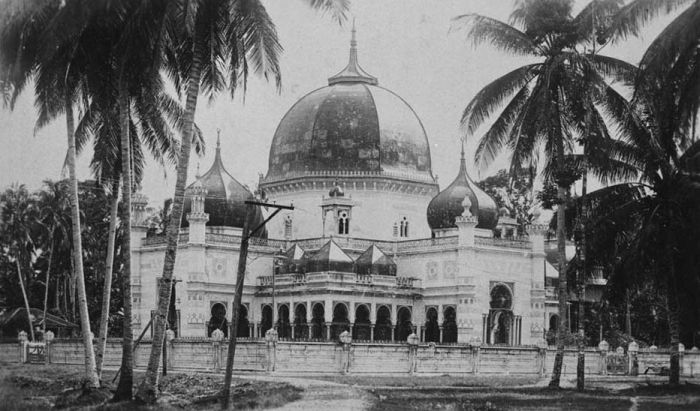
Azizi Mosque in the 1920s.

Construction of the mosque started in 1889, following the order of Tengku Sultan Abdul Aziz, late 19th-century ruler of the Langkat Sultanate and son of Tengku Sultan Haji Musa al-Khalidy al-Muazhzham Syah. The mosque was designed by a German architect. Many of the construction workers were the Chinese inhabitant of Langkat Regency. Material for construction were shipped from Penang and Singapore via the river Batang Serangan, and was transferred on site with 80 ox-carts. Abdul Aziz died before the completion of the mosque, so the construction was taken over by his son Tengku Sultan Mahmud Rahmat Syah. The mosque was completed on June 13, 1902. A minaret was added in 1926.

The mosque was restored several times in 1978-1979, 1980–1981, and 1990-1991.

== Architecture ==
The mosque stands on a complex of approximately 3 hectares (7.4 acres). The main prayer hall is approximately 25 by 25 metres (82 by 82 ft). Three Mughal-styled entrances on the north, south, and east side of the main prayer hall provide entry points. It is equipped with Mughal-styled copper domes, the heaviest is approximately 36 tonnes (40 short tons). The interior is mainly of marble, with Italian crystal chandeliers. Within the mosque complex are several tombs of the royal family belonging to the Langkat Sultanate.

The architecture of the Azizi Mosque had inspired the construction of Zahir Mosque in Kedah, Malaysia.

== See also ==
- Islam in Indonesia
- List of mosques in Indonesia
