= Lim Lean Teng Mansions =

Historic building in Malaysia

Coordinates: 5°25′24″N 100°20′03″E

General information
- Location: Farquhar Street, George Town, Penang, Malaysia
- Completed: 1931
- Cost: 520,000 Straits dollars

Technical details
- Floor count: 4

Design and construction
- Architect(s): David McLeod Craik
- Main contractor: J. C. Gammon (Malaya)

Lim Lean Teng Mansions, originally called Ho Kim Teik Mansions is a historic building in George Town within the Malaysian state of Penang. It is located between Farquhar Street and Northam Road, opposing the Victory Annexe of the Eastern & Oriental Hotel. The building is considered to be one of the first residential flats in the state.

== History ==
In 1929, Ho Kim Teik, a motor dealer, had decided to build a residential-cum-commercial flat building. The building became Ho Kim Teik Mansions, designed by the firm Craik & Leicester. Work on the flat started in late 1929 and completed in early 1931. The contractor for the building was J. C. Gammon (Malaya). The building was built in 2 phases, with the frontage at Farquhar Street being built earlier than the Northam Road frontage.

The ground floor was used as motor showrooms while the 3 floors above were for residential uses. The residential flats were marketed for bachelors and junior staffs of merchant firms that required a base closer to town, with rent at about 75 Straits dollars per month. The commercial tenants at the time includes the motor dealerships Borneo Motors Limited and Italasia Limited and the cosmetics company Max Factor's Makeup Studios. Lift for the building was installed at the end of 1931.

By the mid-1930s, Ho Kim Teik was asset rich but cash poor. He later sold the flat to the entrepreneur Lim Lean Teng, who subsequently renamed the building to Lim Lean Teng Mansions in the 1940s.

The building was acquired by office space provider The Hatchere around 2024, which planned to convert Lim Lean Teng Mansions into an office building. The conversion and renovation is done by K. H. Tan Architects.

== Description ==
Designed by architect David McLeod Craik, Lim Lean Teng Mansions is a building with an approximately 268 feet (81.69 metres) frontage each facing Farquhar Street and Northam Road, stretching from the Grosvenor Motors premises (now Telagamas Motors) to Mission Chapel (now Mission Place). The frontage at Farquhar Street have 4 storeys while the frontage at Northam Road only have 1.
