= HSBC Building (Sungai Petani) =

Historic office building in Kedah, Malaysia

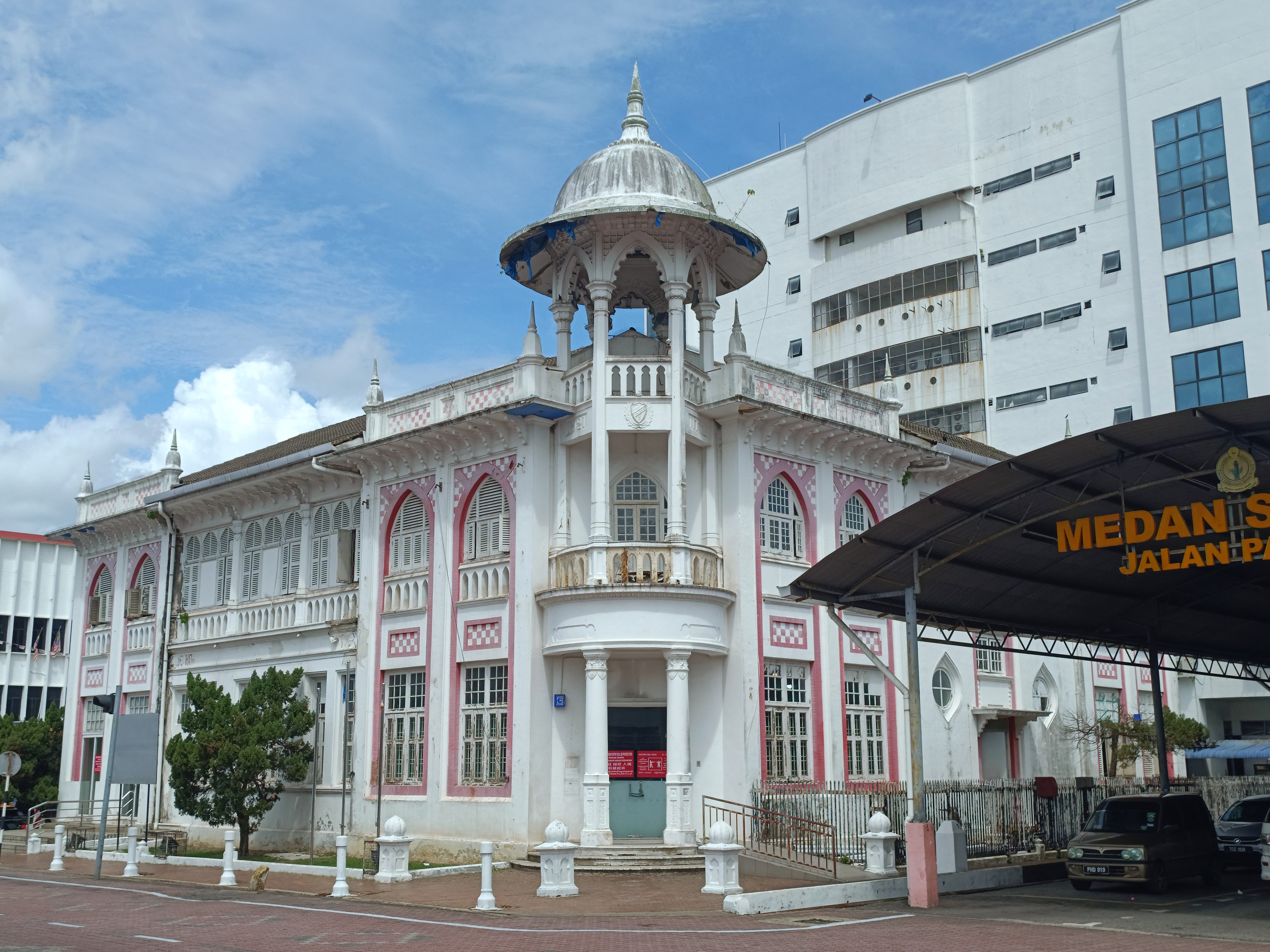
- Interactive map of the HSBC Building area

General information
- Architectural style: Indo-Saracenic
- Location: Ibrahim Road, Sungai Petani, Kuala Muda District, Kedah, Malaysia
- Coordinates: 5.64251°N 100.48871°E
- Opened: 13 February 1922

Design and construction
- Architect: David McLeod Craik (Swan & Maclaren)
- Engineer: Hubert Courtney
- Main contractor: Tang Chong Chiang

The HSBC Building is a historical building in Sungai Petani within the Malaysian state of Kedah. Situated at Ibrahim Road within the city's central area, it once housed the Kedah branch of HSBC and reputed to be one of the first financial institutions in the state.

== History ==
In the early 20th century, the township of Sungai Petani had emerged as the commercial centre of the Kuala Muda District. Eyeing the prospects for the town, the Hongkong and Shanghai Banking Corporation (HSBC) in 1920 decided to open a new premise there.

The building housing the branch was completed and opened on 13 February 1922 by the Regent of Kedah Tunku Ibrahim and the British advisor to Kedah M.S.H. McArthur. It became the second bank established in the state, after the Chartered Bank in Alor Setar. In the beginning, the bank was patronized mainly by European estate managers in the Kuala Muda District and also those from Baling and Kulim. Later, the bank's facilities were extended to Chinese towkays and other businessmen.

When the European theater of World War II began, the branch contributed to war efforts by participating in the "Beat Hitler With Your Odd Cents" campaign. During Japanese advancements in the Malayan campaign, the manager of the branch, Henry Willan, took his records and most of the cash, locked up the bank, left the keys with his compradore and evacuated after several unsuccessful attempts to call the head HSBC office in Singapore. After the Sungai Petani branch was forced to close on 8 December 1941, affairs of the branch were handled by the Singapore office until the state also fell into Japanese hands. During the Japanese occupation, all operations of HSBC were suspended. The building was used as headquarters by the local Japanese military administration, while the old Rest House beside it became the headquarters of the Kempeitai.

HSBC reopened the Sungai Petani branch in mid-1946 after the war. It was also used as a meeting ground by the Freemasons of Lodge Kedah between 1946 and 1947. During the Konfrontasi, the bank was tightly guarded by police forces in fears of bombing attacks. At around 2019, the HSBC branch relocated to a new premise at Lagenda Heights. The building was vacated and later put up for sale by tender in 2024.

== Description ==
Frontage facing Ibrahim Road

The HSBC Building was designed in the Indo-Saracenic style by David McLeod Craik of Swan & MacLaren. The ground floor, about 80 square feet (7.43 square metres), consists of the banking hall, two strong rooms, a large muniment room, and the sub-agent's office. The upper floor has quarters for the sub-agent and assistant drawing room, dining rooms, four bedrooms and bathrooms, verandahs with a central court and two staircases and entrance halls from the street. The building also have an annex for outhouses and servants' quarters. The main feature of the building is the Mughal cupola and dome at the corner over the main entrance to the bank, engraved with the date of the building and the coat of arms of Kedah.

=== Construction and materials ===
The building structure consists of brick and reinforced concrete, with teak used for the staircases, floors, doors and louvred windows and the floor covered in "Malkin" floor tiles. Construction was commenced by the contractor Tang Chong Cheang, of Penang and Sungai Petani and supervised by the engineering firm Hubert Courtney of Penang. The building's electric lighting was provided by Huttenbach, Lazarus and Sons. The interior was furnished with Jacobean style teak counter and furniture by Pritchard & Co. Ltd.

== See also ==
- HSBC Building (Penang)
- Hongkong and Shanghai Bank Building, Ipoh
