= Loke Villa =

Early 20th century residence in Penang, Malaysia

Coordinates: 5°26′09″N 100°18′44″E

- Landward side of Loke Villa
- Interactive map of the Loke Villa area
- Alternative names: Loke Mansion, Seaside Residence, The Butterfly Mansion, The Sun House

General information
- Architectural style: Arts and Crafts, Italianate, Renaissance
- Location: Kelawai Lane, Gurney Drive, George Town, Penang
- Year built: 1923-1924
- Owner: Loke family

Design and construction
- Architect: David McLeod Craik

Loke Villa, also known as Loke Mansion, is a historical beach villa in George Town within the Malaysian state of Penang. It is located at Gurney Drive, adjacent to Gurney Paragon.

== History ==
In 1922 the firm Swan & Maclaren had planned to build a seaside residence at North Beach (now Gurney Drive) for Alan Loke Wan Wye, the son of business magnate Loke Yew. It was built between 1923 and 1924. The mansion was later bought over by Alan Loke's brother, Loke Wan Yat, and thus it became his family's residence. The Loke family eventually depart from Penang, leaving the mansion uninhabited for many years. It was minimally maintained by a caretaking couple during that period.

By the 21st century, the villa was already plagued with problems such as leaking roofs, broken gutters, peeling paints, damaged plasters and termite damage on teak floors, beams and rafters. A restoration exercise was carried out by the firm Arkitek LLA in 2003 and new tenants were sought, which became the Wilkinson family.

Loke Villa had received varying amount of damages when surrounding developments began. The dewatering and vibrations from nearby constructions had caused its antique tiles to pop out of the walls, the shearing of its balustrade, lightbulbs fusing and blowing out and the auxiliary building beside it splitting in half. Due to the ongoing developments causing noises, damages and items falling into the vicinity of the villa, the Wilkinsons had to move their residence elsewhere until after the completion of Gurney Paragon next to it. Their tenancy of the villa ended in 2024.

== Description ==
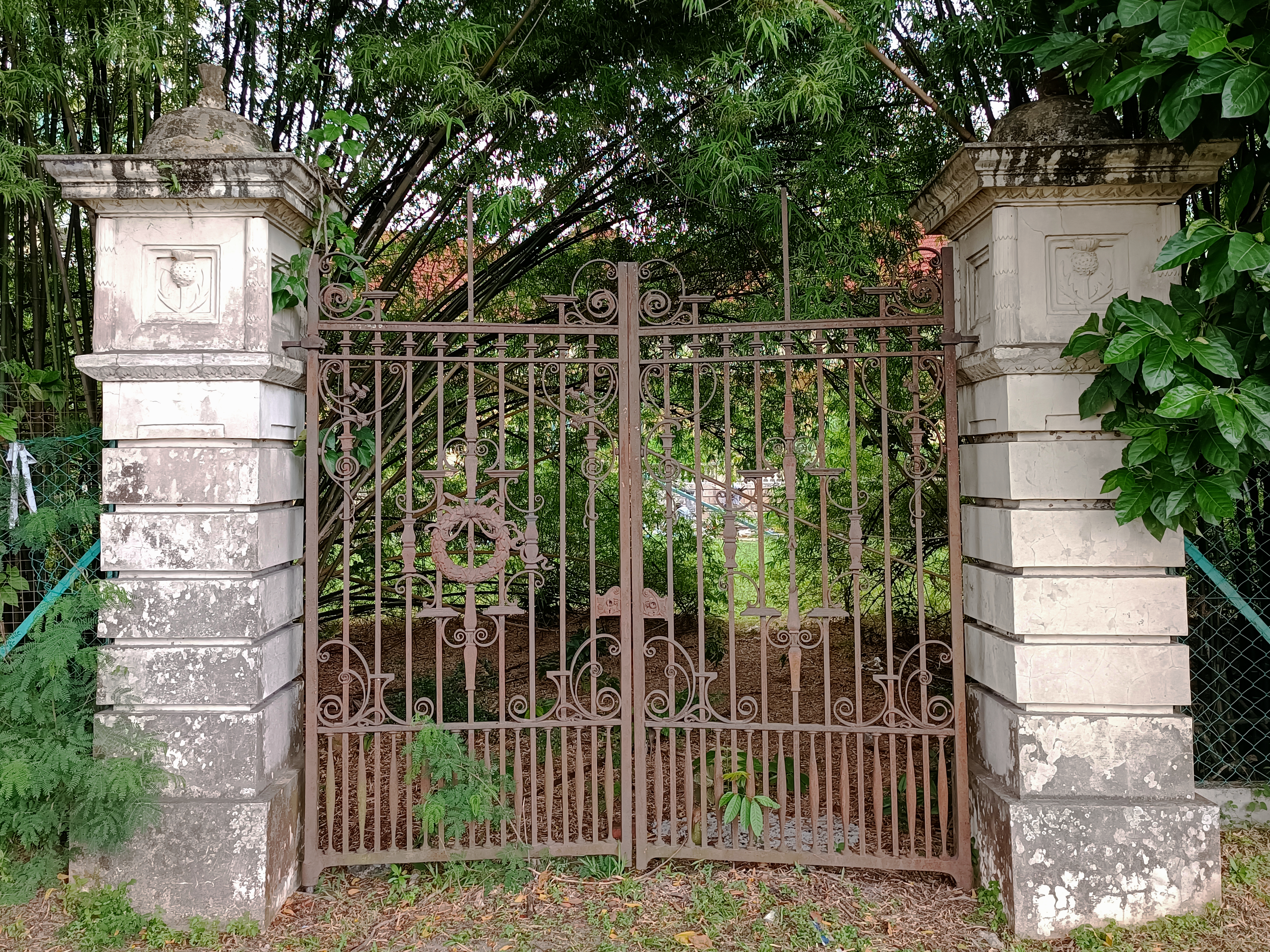
Seaward gate

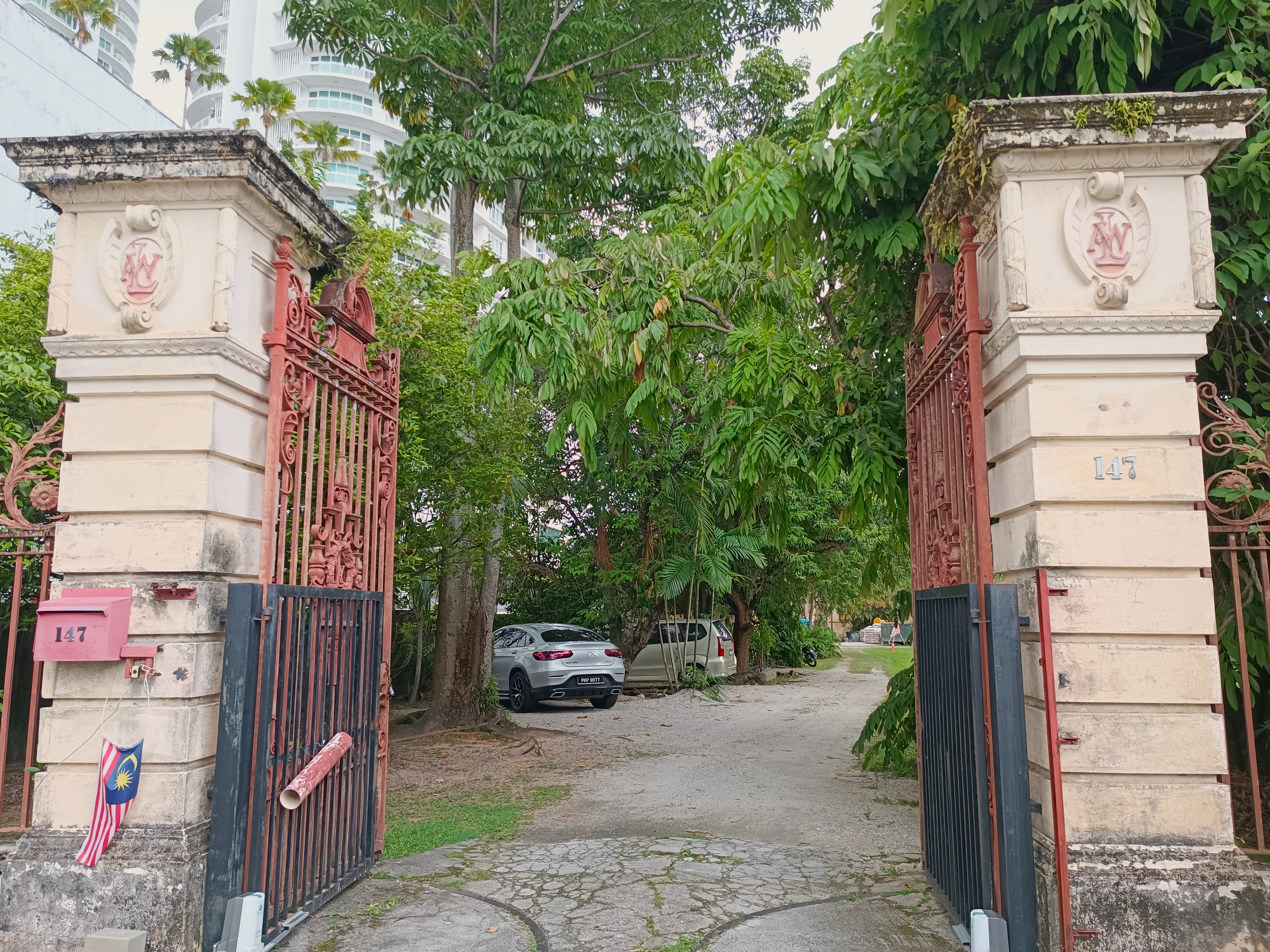
Landward gate

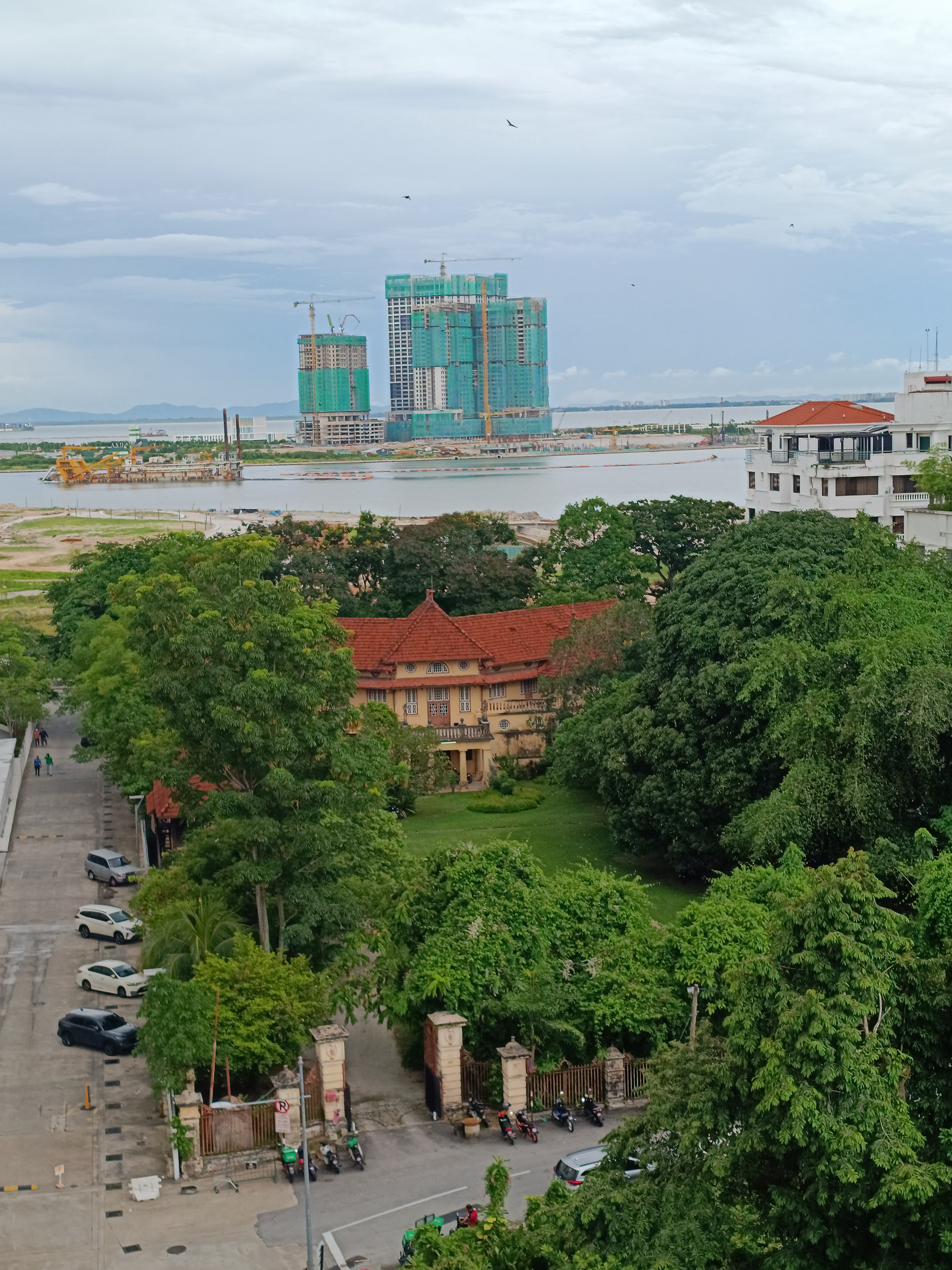
Elevated view of Loke Villa in May 2025.

Designed by David McLeod Craik of Swan, Maclaren & Craik, Loke Villa was a large Arts and Crafts style six-bedroom residence. Designed in a V-shape or ‘butterfly’ plan, the villa incorporated many verandahs and cantilevered balconies with bamboo chicks tucked under the eaves. This helped reduce the glare from the sun, and provided privacy and cross-ventilation to the building.

The entrance portico on the landward side was flanked by buttresses on either end, with Tuscan columns supporting a heavy parapet, which doubles as the railing for the first floor terrace and is decorated with ball finials. The heavy effect of the portico is lightened by a Diocletian fanlight and clerestory of round and semicircular windows. This clerestory is echoed on the seaward elevation.

The villa is articulated in three sections, with long wings terminating in splayed buttresses canted from the central block on either side. The horizontal composition is punctuated by the rhythm of the ground floor pilasters. These are echoed by the wooden verandah posts above. The two storeys are unified by the scrolled corbels on which the verandahs are cantilevered. The villa is topped by steep pitched roofs and the architect's signature terracotta finials. The narrow transoms and muntins, as well as the half-timbered gables at the ends of the two side wings is of Early English Renaissance style.

Towards the seafront is an Italianate open terrace, articulated by three stone pavilions. The terrace is set on an arcadian balustrade wall, with steps leading to the lower compound, and from there to the beach. The villa also includes a garage in a mews building.

The house was finished with modern amenities and reputedly equipped with the first intercom telephone system among the Chinese houses in Penang.

== In popular culture ==
Loke Villa was featured in the film Road to Dawn, produced by Shenzhen Media Group. The film depicts the Chinese revolutionary Sun Yat-sen's activities while he was seeking refuge in Penang. In the film, Loke Villa became the venue of the birthday party for the fictional opium cartel boss Xu Boheng's wife.
