= Ayer Itam War Memorial Park =

War memorial in George Town, Penang, Malaysia

- 檳榔嶼華僑抗戰殉職機工罹難同胞紀念碑 (Chinese)
- George Town
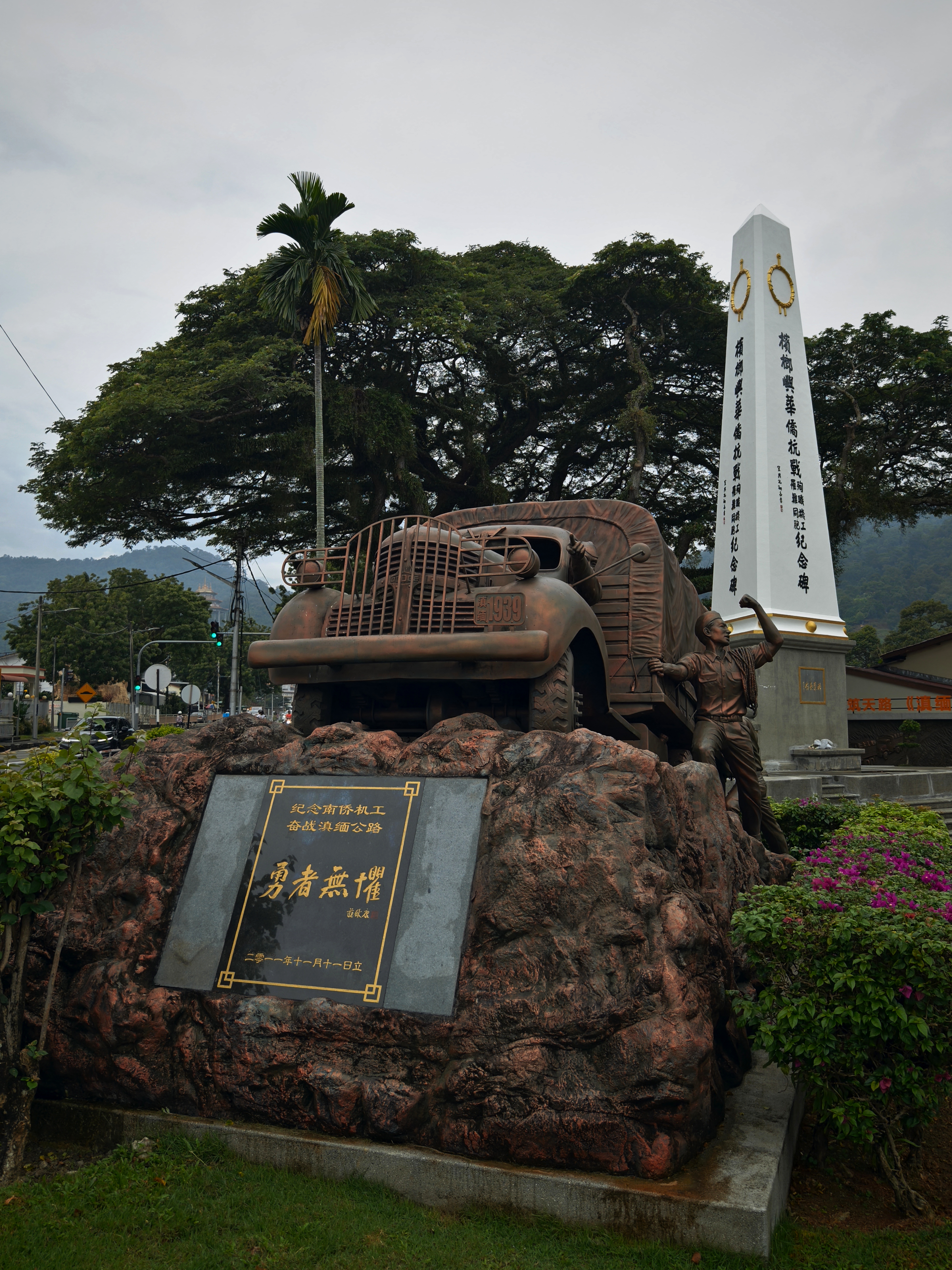
- For the local Chinese dead of the Second Sino-Japanese War and the Japanese occupation of Malaya
- Unveiled: 1951
- Location: 5°24′21″N 100°16′57″E; Ayer Itam, George Town, Penang

The Ayer Itam War Memorial Park is a war memorial in George Town within the Malaysian state of Penang. Located at the suburb of Ayer Itam, the memorial commemorates the local Chinese who lost their lives during the Second Sino-Japanese War and the subsequent Japanese occupation of Malaya. The memorial was unveiled in 1951, with additional upgrades completed in 2011.

== Background ==
The establishment of the Republic of China and the unification of large swathes of China under the Kuomintang in the early 20th century led to an increase in political activism within the Chinese community in Penang. As tensions between China and Japan intensified, Penang's Chinese engaged in civil unrest and imposed a unilateral embargo on Japanese trade. Following the outbreak of the Second Sino-Japanese War in 1937, the Penang China Relief Fund was formed to remit monetary assistance to victims of the conflict.

As Japanese forces blockaded China's maritime trade and advanced inland, the Chinese government expedited the construction of the Burma Road, which ultimately required around 200,000 labourers. In 1939, Singapore-based businessman Tan Kah Kee organised a mobilisation of volunteer drivers and mechanics to support the construction of the Burma Road. More than 3,200 volunteers were recruited from across British Malaya, including 358 from Penang. Aside from the mountainous terrain at the Sino–Burmese border, the volunteers encountered continuous Japanese aerial attacks.

Japan invaded Malaya in December 1941, capturing Penang on the 19th. Japanese military police initiated the Sook Ching purges, ostensibly aimed at suppressing political opposition and individuals they deemed subversive. The campaign, in fact, targeted the local Chinese population which had provided financial support to China during the conflict. While the total killed in the Sook Ching massacres remains unknown, the Penang China Relief Fund documented over 1,600 Chinese victims who were buried in mass graves across Penang.

== History ==
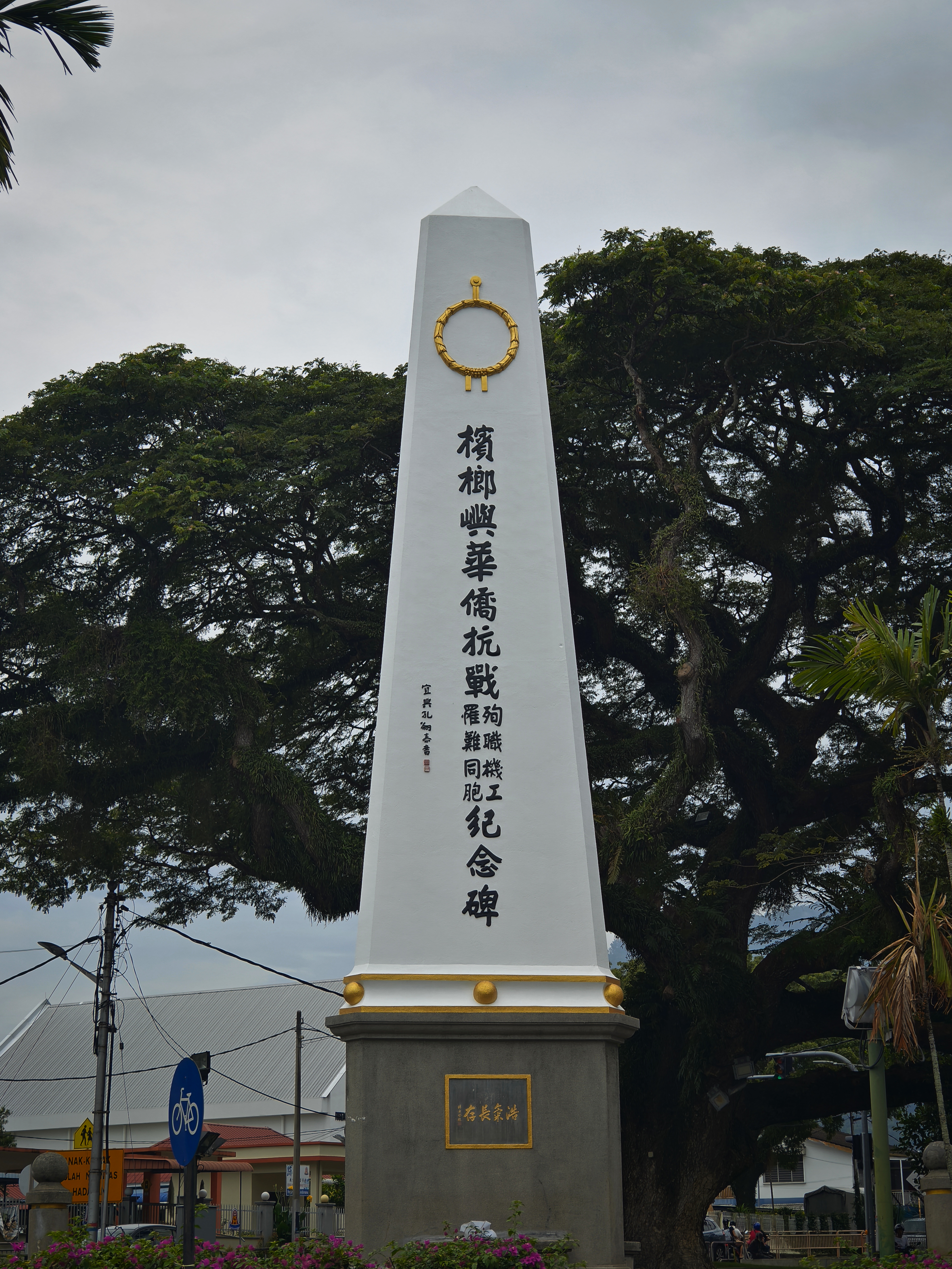
The 49 ft (15 m) obelisk was unveiled by local tycoon Lim Lean Teng in 1951.

After the war, a 49 ft (15 m) obelisk was erected by the Penang China Relief Fund to honour local volunteers of the Second Sino-Japanese War and victims of the Japanese occupation of Malaya. The site of the obelisk, now known as the Ayer Itam War Memorial Park, had been originally donated by the Chow Kok Kin family. The white obelisk features seven steps symbolising 7 July 1937, the date of the Marco Polo Bridge incident that sparked the war. Between 1950 and 1951, about 800 incomplete skeletons of the Sook Ching victims were exhumed at several locations across Penang Island – namely Ayer Itam, Gelugor, Tanjong Bungah and Batu Ferringhi. The remains were then cremated at the Batu Gantong crematorium and buried beneath the obelisk. The memorial was officially unveiled on Armistice Day in 1951.

In 1952, the Penang China Relief Fund was disbanded and the management of the memorial was transferred to the board of trustees of Kong Min School, which oversees a network of Chinese primary schools in the area. The memorial was upgraded at a cost of RM400,000 in 2011. This included the addition of a bronze sculpture depicting transport volunteers pushing a truck up a slope along the Burma Road, as well as a relief wall featuring carvings of volunteers and trucks under attack by Japanese warplanes. The memorial continues to serve as a site for annual Remembrance Day commemorations.

== See also ==
- Penang Cenotaph
