= Esplanade, Penang =

City square in George Town, Malaysia

Esplanade Padang Kota Lama (Malay)
- Esplanade and city square
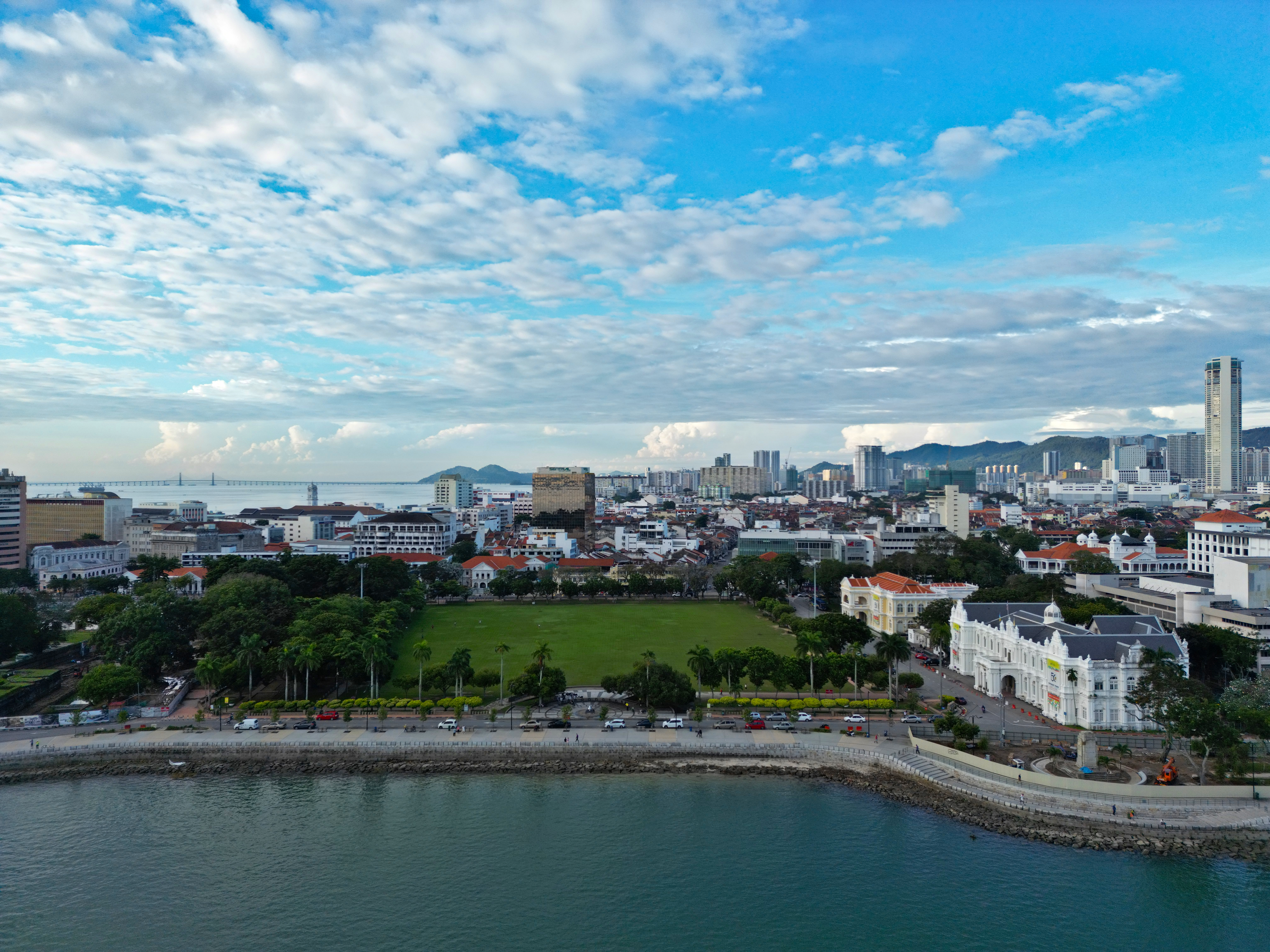
- Opened: 1786; 240 years ago
- Owner: Penang Island City Council
- Location: Jalan Tun Syed Sheh Barakbah and Esplanade Road; George Town, Penang, Malaysia

UNESCO World Heritage Site
- Type: Cultural
- Criteria: ii, iii, iv
- Designated: 2008 (32nd session)
- Part of: George Town UNESCO Core Zone
- Reference no.: 1223
- Region: Asia-Pacific
- Location within Central George Town, Penang
- Coordinates: 5°25′19.92″N 100°20′30.948″E

The Esplanade is a seafront city square in the heart of George Town within the Malaysian state of Penang. It covers the field adjacent to Fort Cornwallis, known locally as the Padang, and the seaside promenade along the edge of the field. The City Hall faces the Padang, while the Cenotaph is also located along the promenade.

The Esplanade was the site of a significant event in Penang's history; it was here where Captain Francis Light, the founder of George Town, first landed on 17 July 1786. Upon claiming possession of Penang Island (then Prince of Wales Island) for the British Empire, the Esplanade became the first area to be cleared by Light, while Fort Cornwallis was constructed immediately east of the clearing.

The cleared field was then used as a military parade ground, prior to its recreational and sports use beginning in the mid-19th century. The planned layout of the Padang is similar to that of the Padang in Singapore and Merdeka Square in Kuala Lumpur. The Esplanade is currently a major venue for celebrations and cultural activities in Penang.

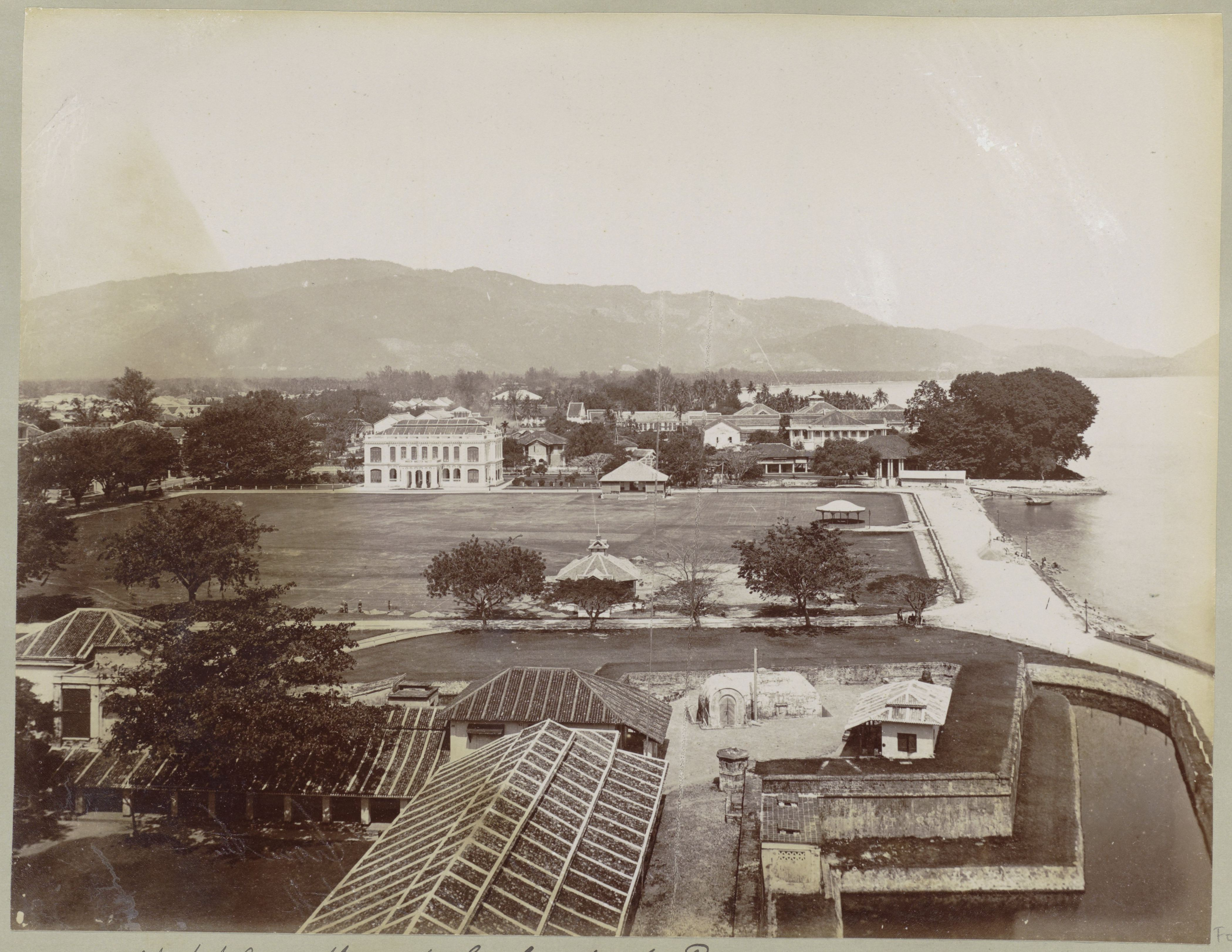
The Esplanade in the 1890s

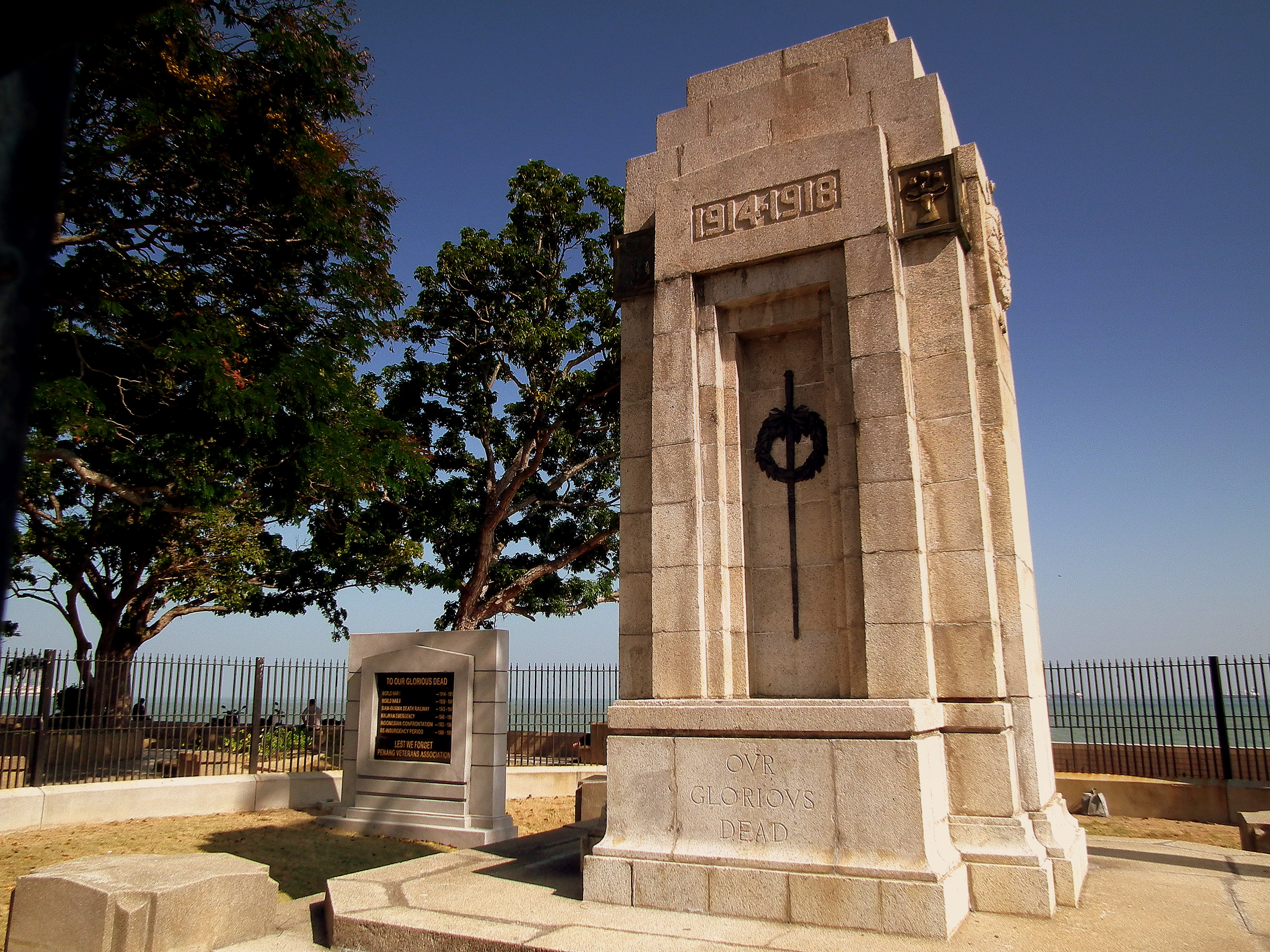
The Cenotaph, built to commemorate the Allied personnel who lost their lives during World War I.

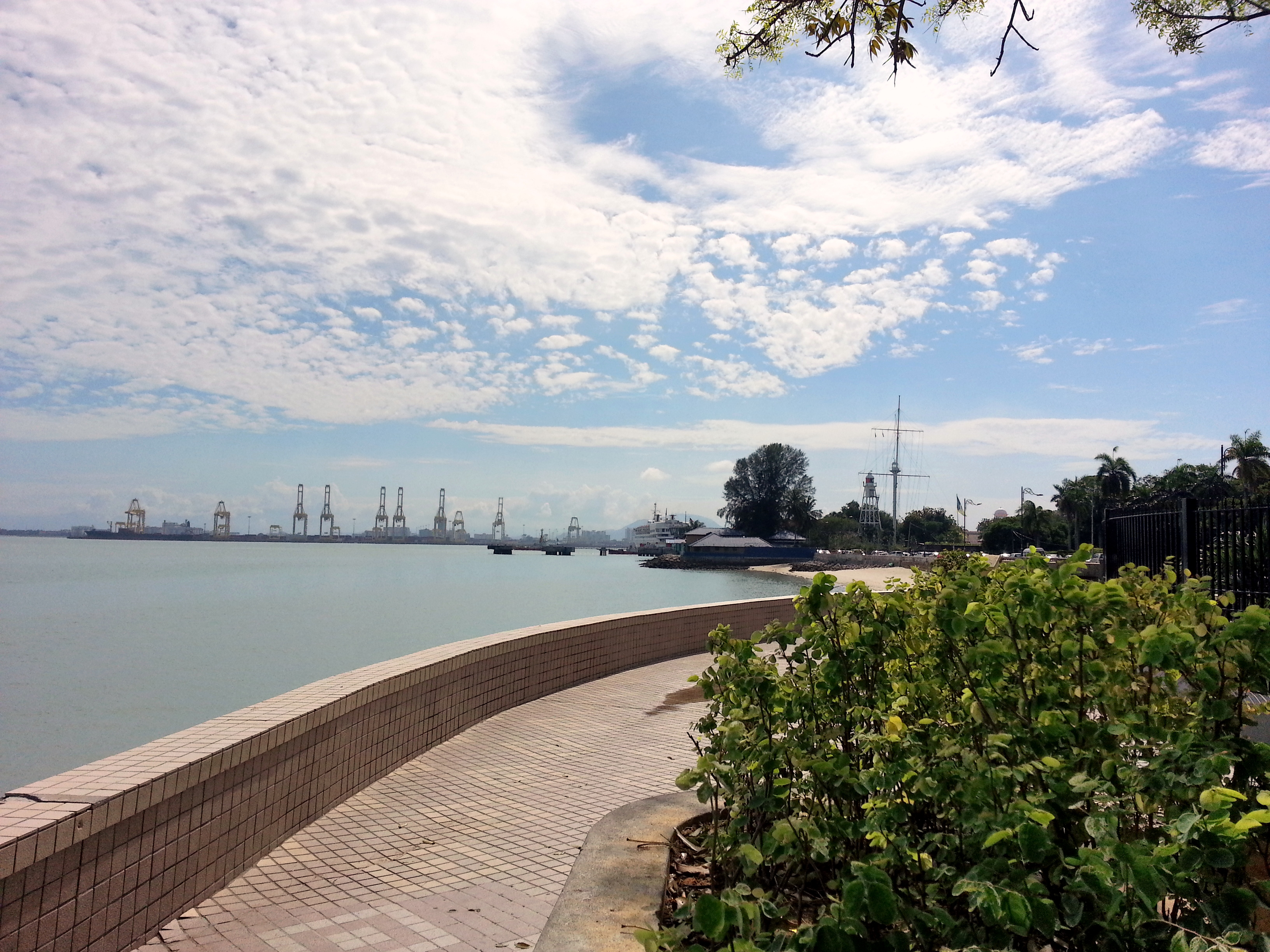
View of the Port of Penang from the Esplanade

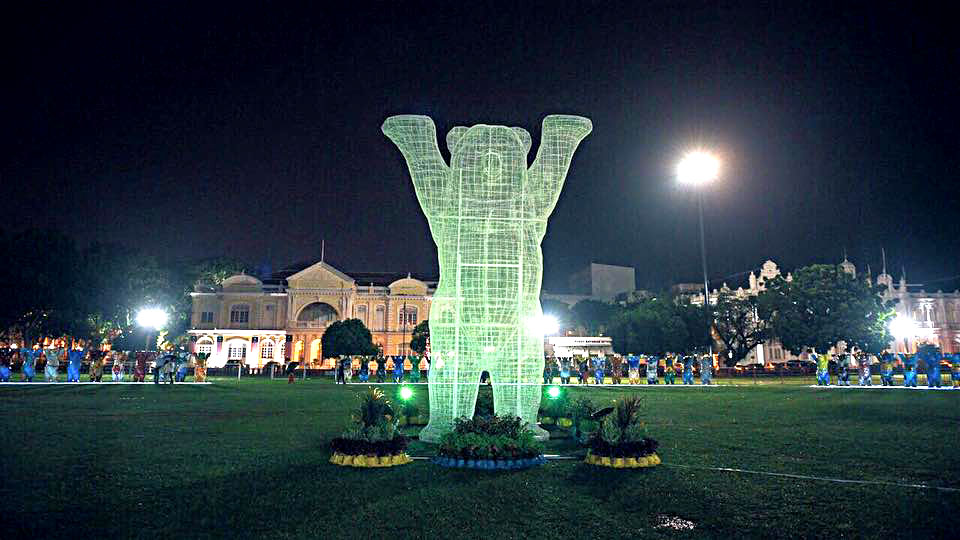
The United Buddy Bears exhibition at the Esplanade in 2016

== History ==
The Esplanade is the site on Penang Island where Captain Francis Light, a trader for the British East India Company, first landed on 17 July 1786. Having obtained the island for the British Empire, Light then ordered his ships to fire silver coins into the then forested area to entice immigrants to clear as much land as possible. Fort Cornwallis was also constructed next to the cleared field.

The field, now known as the Padang, was the place where sepoys from India, who were deployed to Penang by the British East India Company, disembarked from their transport vessels.

The Padang has been used for recreational purposes since the mid-19th century. A bandstand, donated by Cheah Tek Soon, a local businessman, was erected at the Esplanade, providing a stage for music bands to entertain the public. The Padang was also utilised as a cricket ground; a two-storey pavilion, designed by Wilson & Neubronner, was built in 1908 by the then Penang Cricket Club. Its rival, the Penang Recreational Club, had also erected a similar structure at the Esplanade for its supporters.

However, these structures were destroyed during World War II, when Allied bombers targeted the Esplanade, which was at the time used by the Imperial Japanese Army. The Cenotaph, which had been constructed to honour the Allied personnel of World War I, was also reduced to ruins. After the war, the Cenotaph was rebuilt and reopened in 1948.

== Activities ==
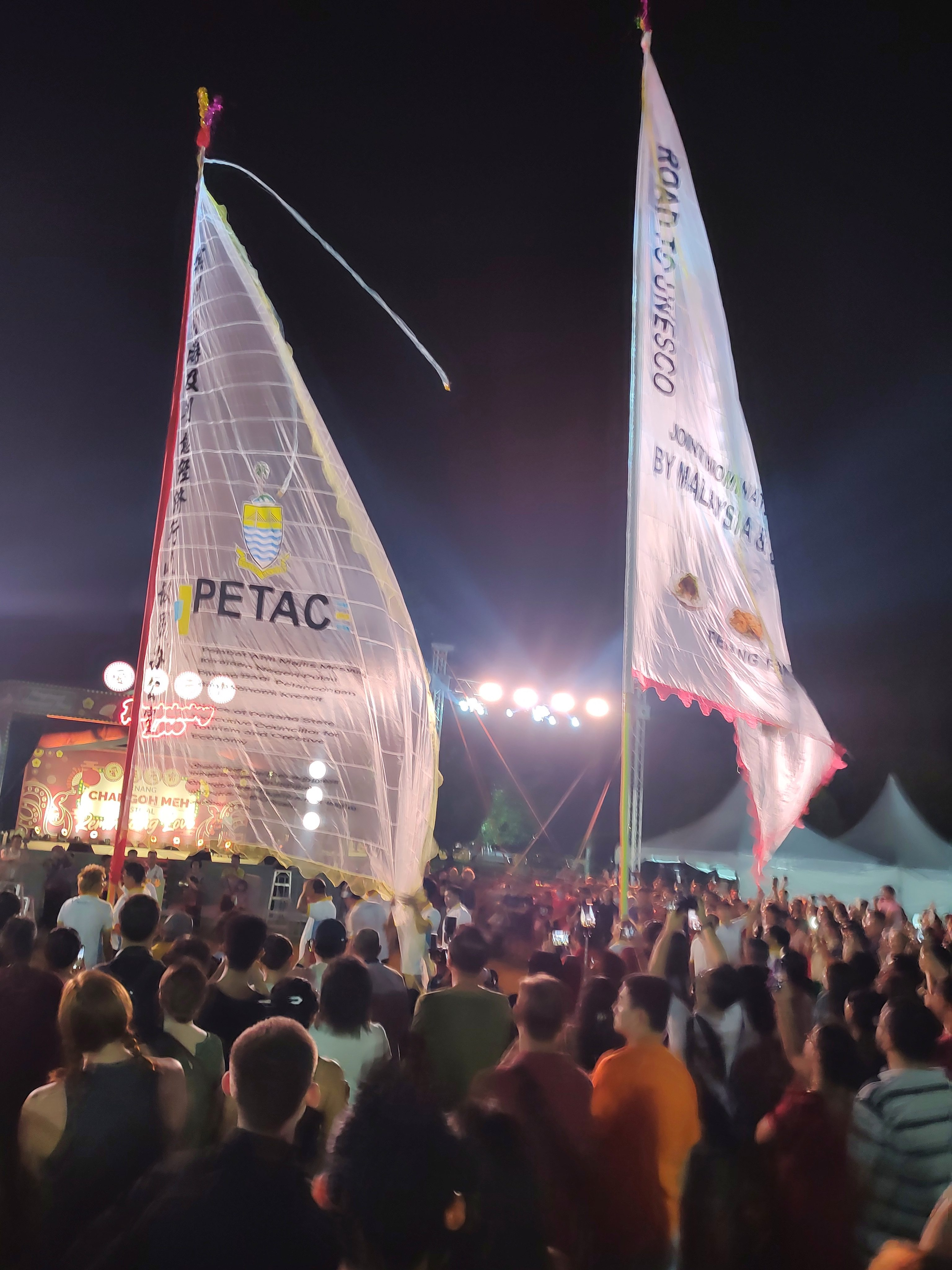
A chingay demonstration at Penang Chap Goh Meh Festival 2025

The cleared field was then used as a military parade ground prior to its recreational and sports use beginning in the mid-19th century.

Today, the Esplanade is a major venue for celebrations and cultural performances, such as the anniversary of George Town's inscription as a UNESCO World Heritage Site, Bon Odori (a Japanese cultural festival) and Chap Goh Meh (the last day of the Chinese New Year). A portion of the Esplanade has also been converted into a Speakers' Corner, the first of its kind in Malaysia.

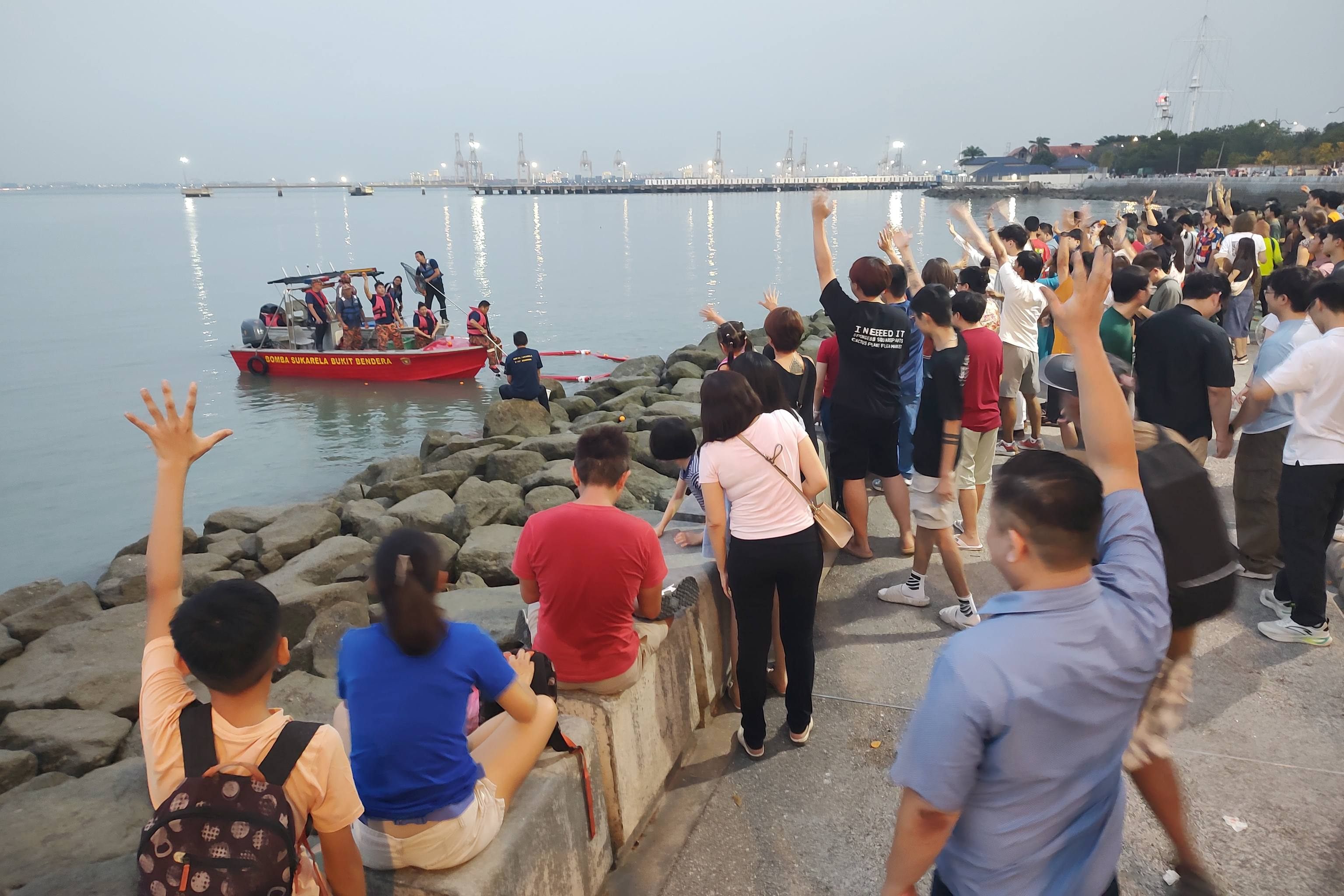
Throwing mandarin oranges into the sea at the end of Chinese New Year

In addition, every first Saturday of the month, the 'Esplanade in Action' cultural performances are held at the Esplanade, featuring the various cultures of Penang. A night market also opens at the Esplanade every Friday, Saturday and Sunday between 5 p.m. and midnight.

Another landmark within the Esplanade is the Cenotaph, which was originally built in honour of Allied personnel who lost their lives during World War I. The Remembrance Day commemorations are held annually at the Cenotaph to honour not just the Allied personnel of World War I, but also those who were killed during World War II, the Malayan Emergency and the Indonesian Confrontation.

== Media appearances ==
- The Amazing Race 16
