= Zahir Mosque =

State mosque of Kedah, Malaysia

- Masjid Zahir مسجد زاهر
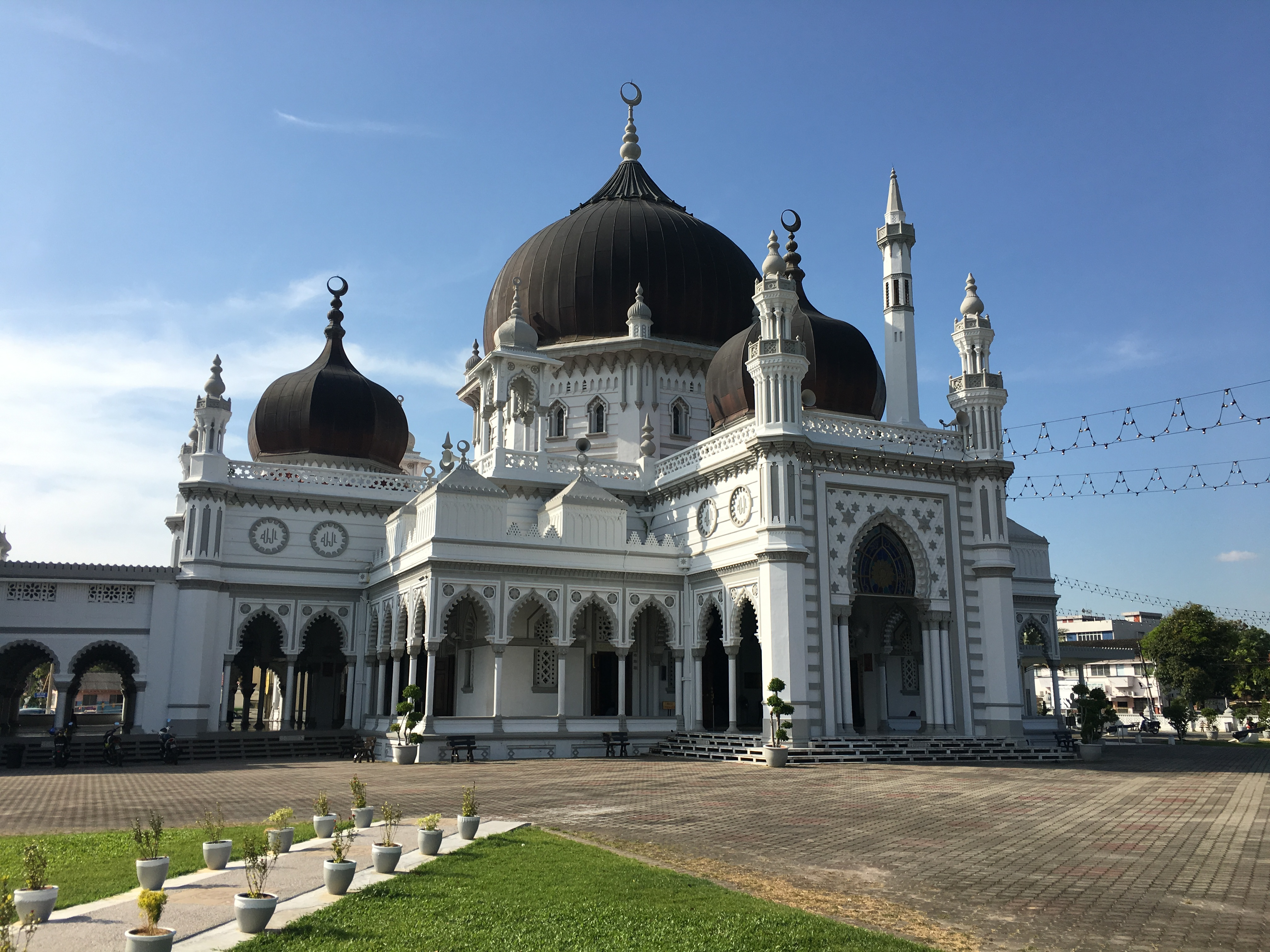

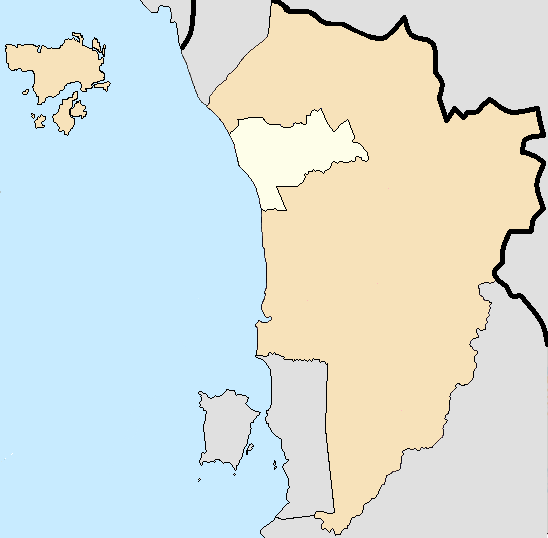
- Location within Alor Setar

Religion
- Affiliation: Islam
- Branch/tradition: Shafi'i Sunni
- Ecclesiastical or organizational status: Mosque
- Status: Active

Location
- Location: Alor Setar, Kota Setar, Kedah
- Country: Malaysia
- Interactive map of Zahir Mosque
- Coordinates: 6°07′13″N 100°21′54″E

Architecture
- Type: Mosque architecture
- Style: Islamic; Indo-Saracenic Revival
- Groundbreaking: 1912
- Completed: 1915

Specifications
- Dome: Five
- Minaret: Several

The Zahir Mosque (Malay: Masjid Zahir, Kedah Malay: Masjid Zaheq) is a Sunni mosque in Alor Setar, Kota Setar, Kedah, Malaysia, and the state mosque of Kedah. Built in British Malaya in 1912, the Zahir Mosque is one of the grandest and oldest mosques in Malaysia.

== History ==
The mosque was built upon the tomb and grave of fallen Kedah warrior that died during the Siamese invasion of Kedah.

The design was inspired by the vision of the late Sultan Muhammad Jiwa Zainal Abidin II, who was in turn inspired by the Azizi Mosque of the Langkat Sultanate in North Sumatra. The state's annual Qurʾān-reading competition is held within the premises of the mosque.

== Gallery ==
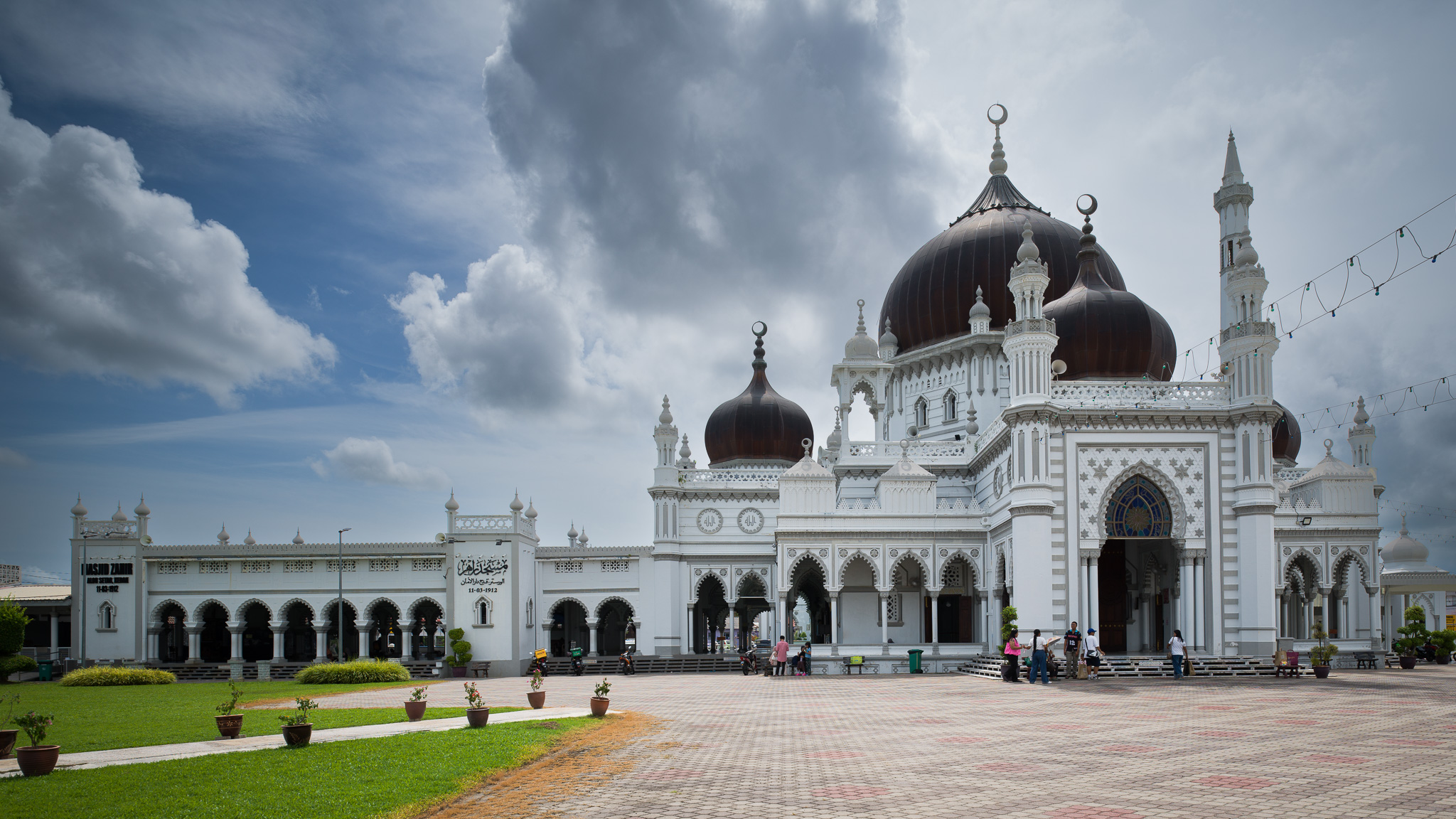
Main Entrance of the Zahir Masjid

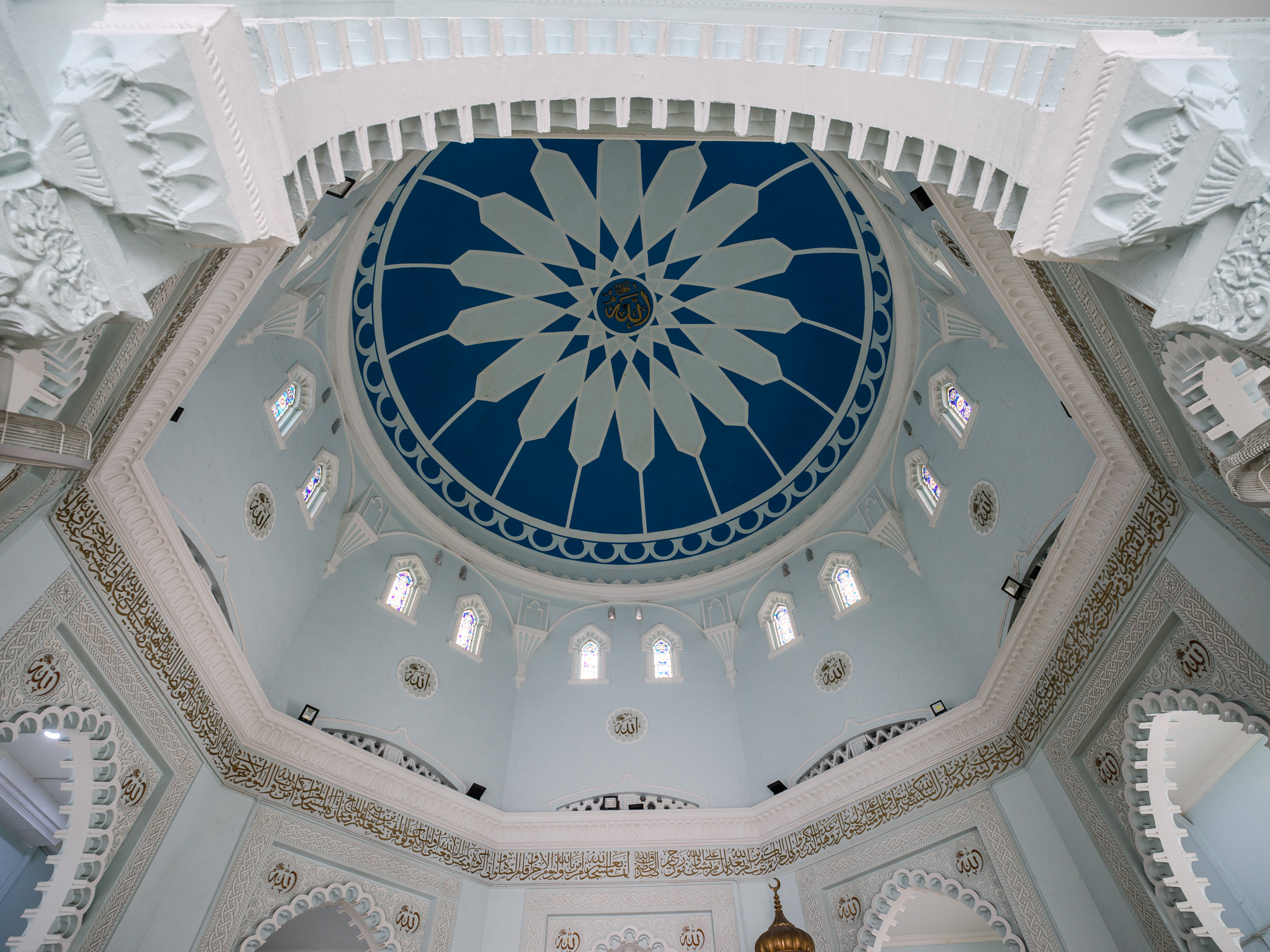
Dome

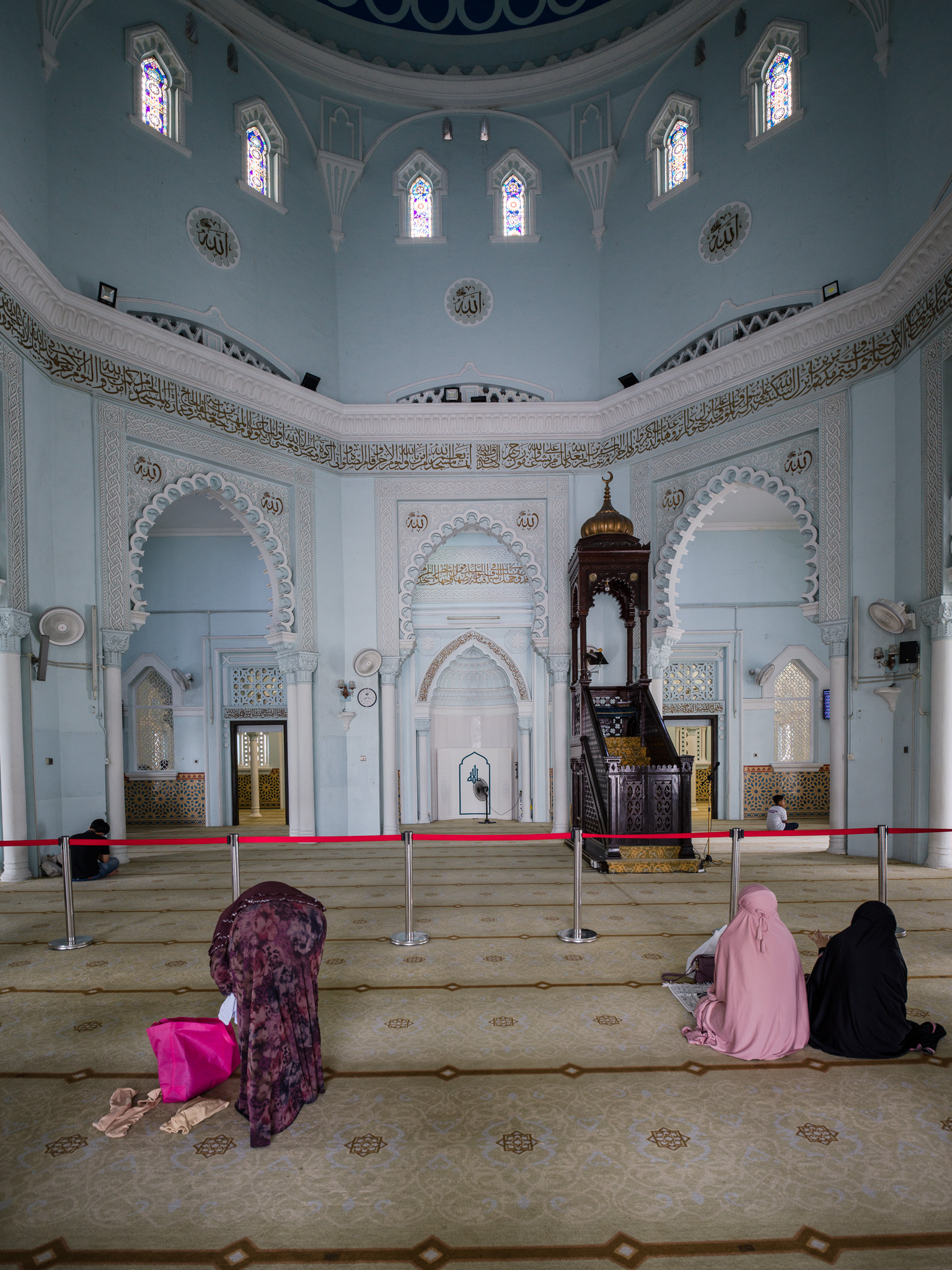
Prayer area

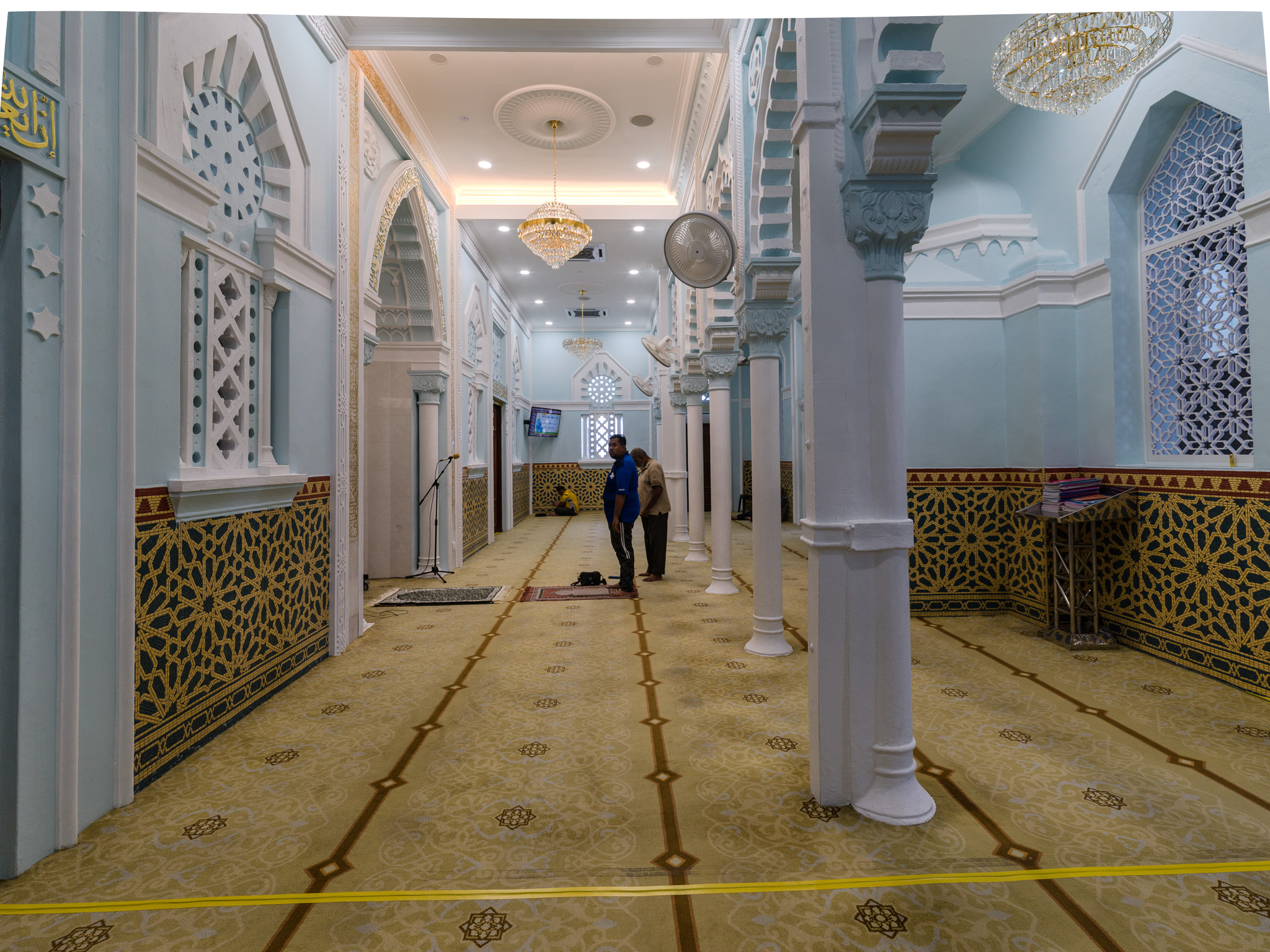
Interior

== See also ==
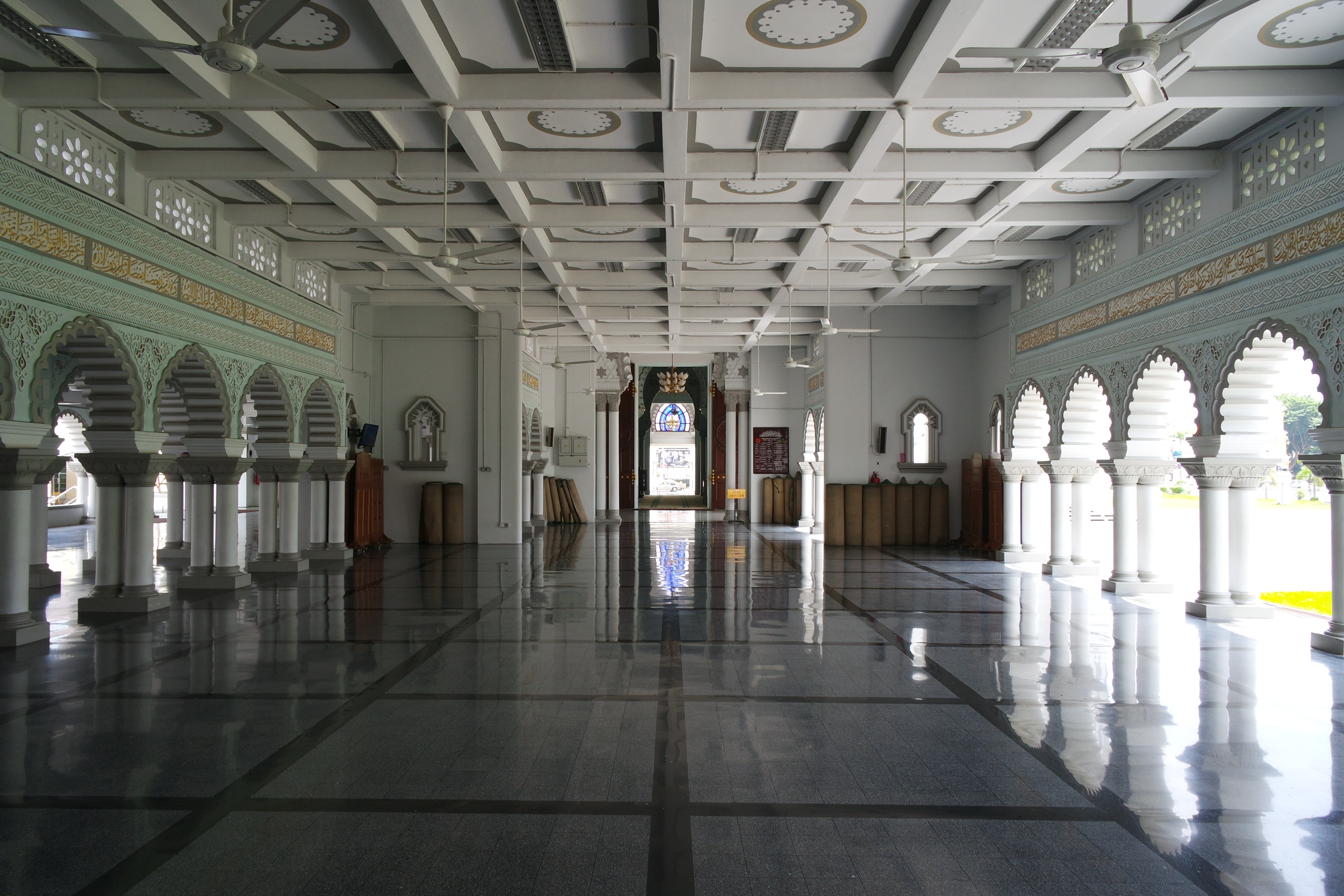
Zahir Mosque prayer hall

- Islam in Malaysia
- List of mosques in Malaysia
