= Jinrikisha Station =

Historic building in Singapore

Coordinates: 1°16′48″N 103°50′37″E

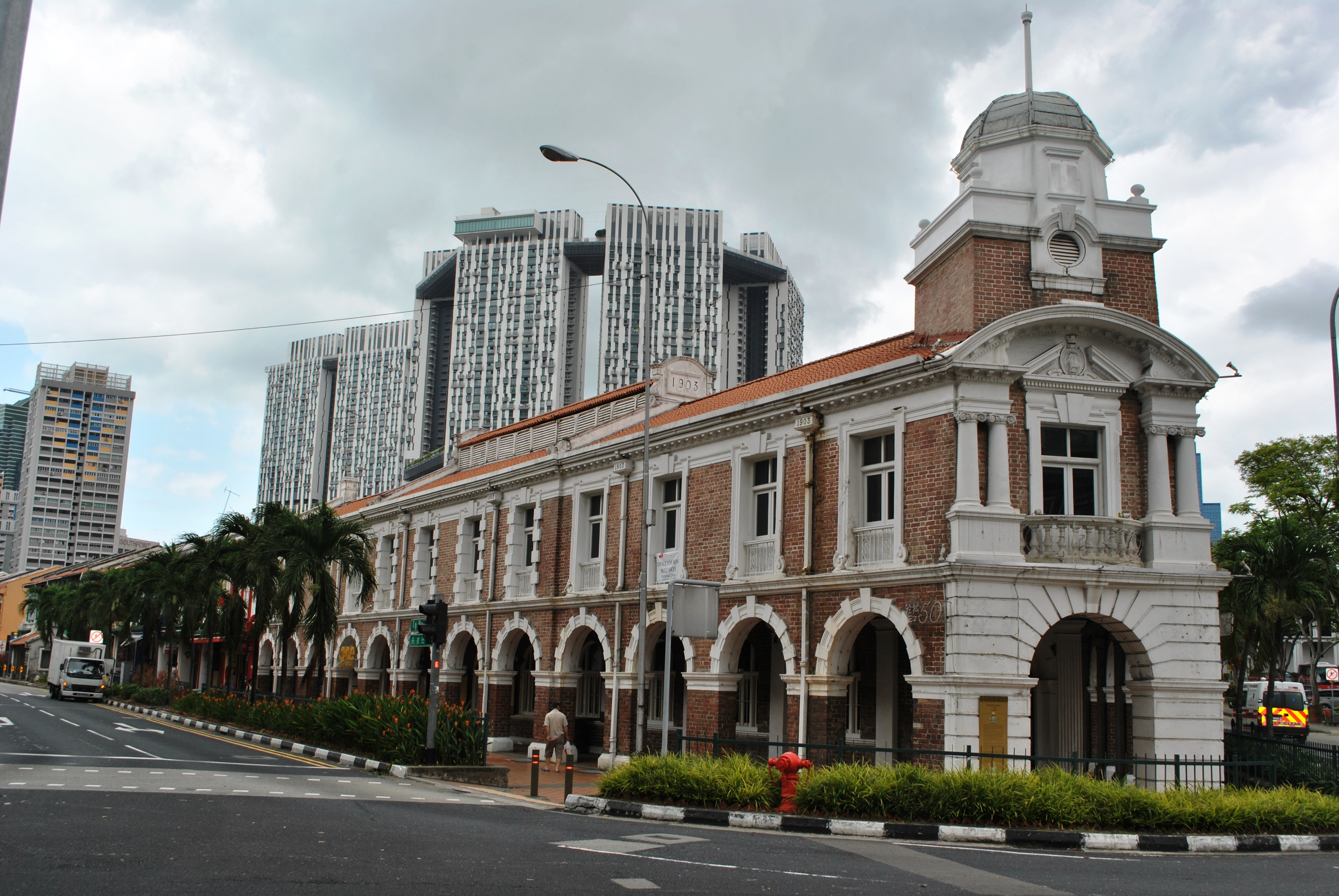
Jinrikisha Station

The Jinrikisha Station is a historic building in Singapore, and is located at Neil Road in Tanjong Pagar in the Chinatown district within the Singapore's central business district.

== History ==
At one time the Jinrikisha Station was used as a family planning clinic. In 1987 it was one of the first buildings in Tanjong Pagar restored by the Urban Redevelopment Authority (URA). It was refurbished into a shopping and recreational centre. There are a seafood restaurant, shops, offices and nightclubs in the present building.

== Architecture ==
Samuel Tomlinson was Municipal Engineer from 1896 to 1902, during which time D.M. Craik was Municipal Architect. The date on the Jinrikisha Station building responds well to the triangular corner site and is typical of many other ornate buildings of the early 1900s.

However, originally, the building had exposed brickwork, now painted, and this must have been somewhat unusual at the time. The Ionic pilasters and curved pediment on the corner and the square tower with its octagonal cupola are pleasing and important elements of Tanjong Pagar Road and surroundings.

== Notes ==
- National Heritage Board (2002), Singapore's 100 Historic Places, Archipelago Press, ISBN 981-4068-23-3
- Norman Edwards, Peter Keys (1996), Singapore - A Guide to Buildings, Streets, Places, Times Books International, ISBN 9971-65-231-5
