= Charles Geoffrey Boutcher =

English architect

Charles Geoffrey Boutcher (1884–1964) was a London-born architect and a partner of the Penang, Ipoh and Johor architectural firm, Stark & McNeill, in Malaysia. His most recognized project is the construction of the Zahir Mosque in Alor Setar. In 1932, he started his own practice under the name of Boutcher & Co., located at 9 Weld Quay, Penang. Boutcher & Co. was the sole Penang-based architectural company to have been resuscitated after the European war. Boutcher also had offices at 19 Beach Street in Penang and at 21 Hale Street in Ipoh. The practice was terminated only after Boutcher retired in 1953.

== Education ==
Boutcher studied at the Central School of Arts and Crafts and at the City of London College. He was certified in advanced geometry, architectural perspective, honours building construction, land surveying, mathematics, quantity surveying. In 1906, he studied a fourth-year course at the Architectural Association. He became the secretary of the Architectural Association's Camera, Sketch and Debate Club.

== Career ==
His first workplace was the office of T. Hamilton, Crawford and George Jack. As from 1907, he worked with Leonard Stokes, Fellow of the Royal Institute of British Architects. He started his own practice at 40 Great James Street, Bedford Row, London from 1909 to 1913. In 1910 he was appointed an associate of the Royal Institute of British Architects. He went to Malaysia in 1913 and joined the Public Works Department (PWD) in Kedah.

He designed various buildings in Alor Setar, Kedah, among which are: the Zahir Mosque, the Residence of the President of the State Council, English schools, hospitals, the Kedah Club buildings, the Central Market, government bungalows, the Central Police Station, government officers' quarters, the bridge approach, shophouses, Indian Club buildings.

In 1920, he obtain a Fellow of the Royal Institute of British Architects (FRIBA) accreditation.

== Partner architects ==
- John Mackie Venters: Fellow of the Royal Institute of British Architects
- Weng-Kuan Chan: Associate of the Royal Institute of British Architects, Associate member of the Institute of Architects Malaya; partner at Ipoh atelier
- Chiao Venzoong: Shanghai-born architectural assistant
- M.P. Holmberg: Fellow of the Royal Institute of British Architects
- Arthur Mylo: former partner of Stark & McNeill
- V.R. Savi: Fellow of the Royal Institute of British Architects
- George M. Davidson: Associate of the Royal Institute of British Architects
