= Hongkong and Shanghai Bank Building, Ipoh =

1930s building in Ipoh, Malaysia

Coordinates: 4°35′52″N 101°04′30″E

Hongkong and Shanghai Bank Building
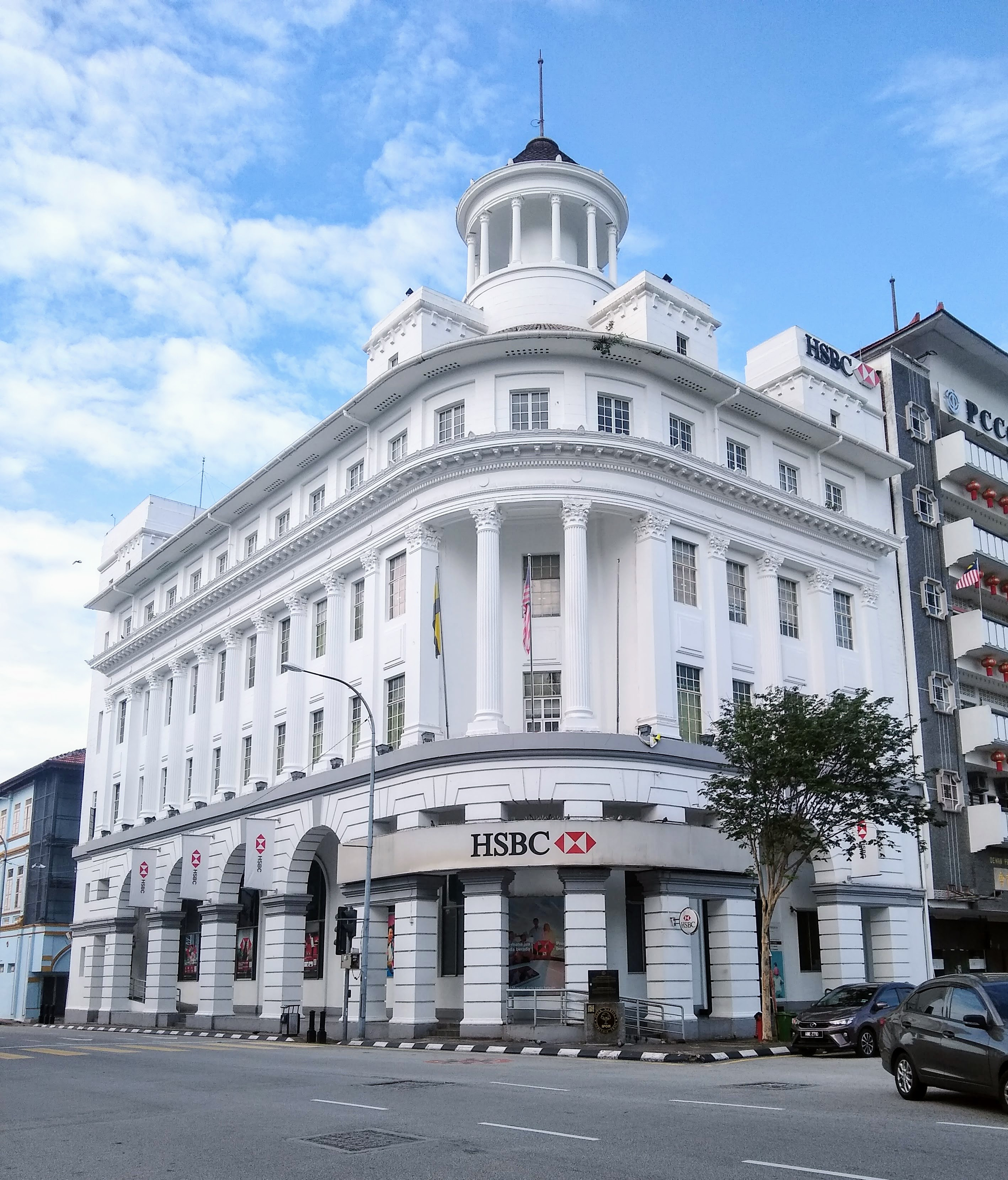
- Interactive map of the Hongkong and Shanghai Bank Building area

General information
- Architectural style: Neo-Renaissance
- Location: Corner of Jalan Sultan Yusuf and Jalan Tun Sambanthan, Ipoh, Malaysia
- Current tenants: HSBC
- Opened: 31 October 1931

Technical details
- Floor count: 4

The Hongkong and Shanghai Bank Building is a historical building in Ipoh, Malaysia. Opened in 1931, it continues to serve as Hongkong and Shanghai Banking Corporation's (HSBC) main branch in Ipoh.

== History ==
Hongkong and Shanghai Bank opened its first branch in Ipoh on 14 March 1910 operating from a small wooden building provided by the government situated near Ipoh post office. Later it moved to Station Road (now Jalan Dato' Maharajalela) where it leased part of the ground floor of the Straits Trading Company's premises.

During the late 1920s, the Bank acquired the site for its new premises in the town's commercial centre when it purchased a block of six shop-houses in Belfield Street (now Jalan Sultan Yusuf) from a Chinese owner, who a year previously had acquired the block from Sime, Darby & Co, paying what was reported to be a sum in excess of $100,000 Straits.

Situated at the corner of Belfield Street and Hale Street (now Jalan Tun Sambanthan), the construction of the building was completed in 1931, and was opened at a formal ceremony on 31 October 1931 by the Sultan of Perak in the presence of a large gathering including the British Resident Bertram Elles, and manager J.H.Lind.

== Description ==
Constructed in the Neo-Renaissance style, the building was the tallest in the town during the pre-independence era. Finished externally in artificial granite, the building consists of four storeys with the banking hall on the ground floor finished using Italian marble.
