= Masjid Alkaff Upper Serangoon =

Mosque located in Toa Payoh, Singapore

Masjid Alkaff Upper Serangoon أبر سيرنغون مسجد الكاف
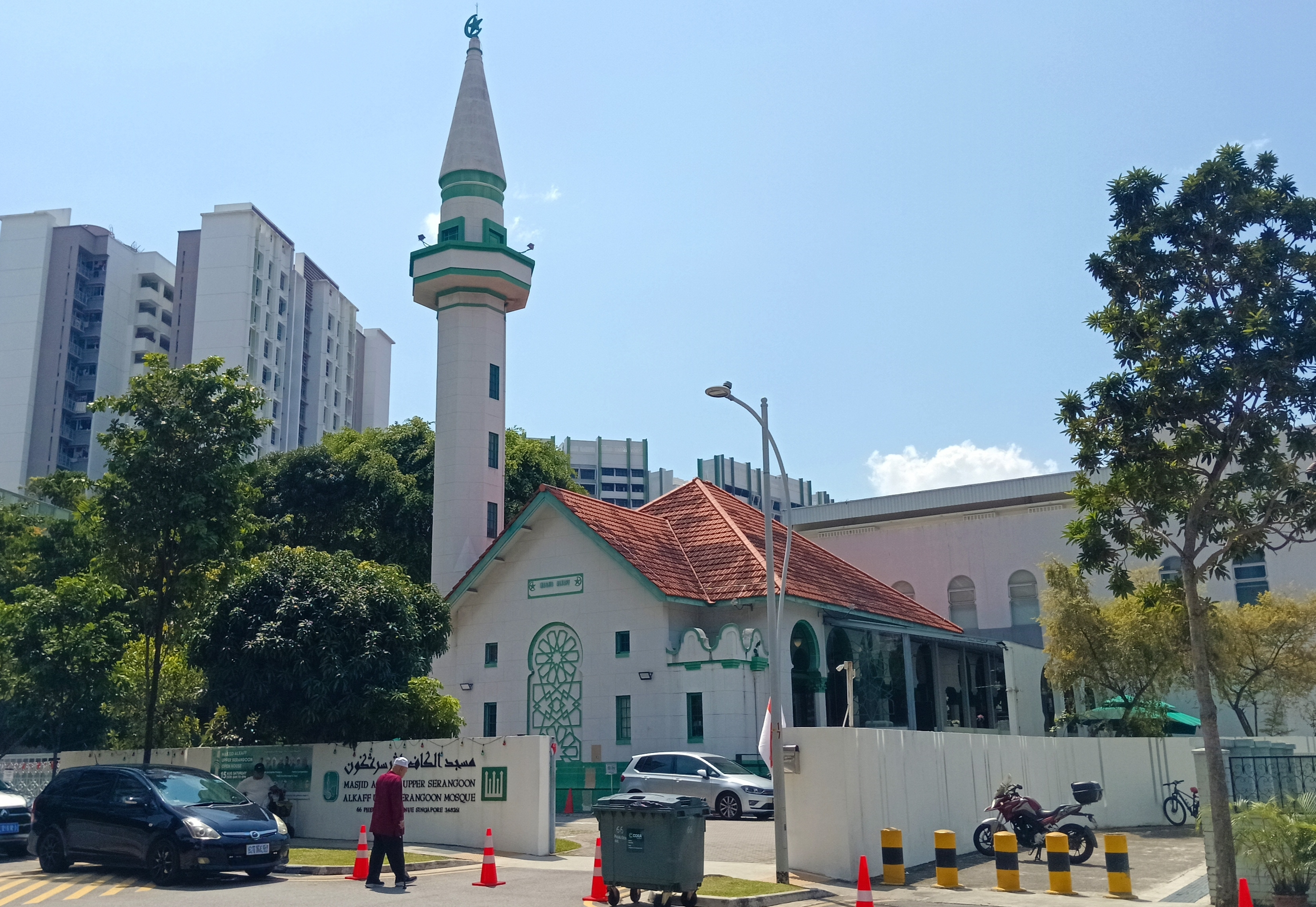
- The main facade of Masjid Alkaff Upper Serangoon that faces Pheng Geck Avenue.

- Location in Singapore

Religion
- Affiliation: Sunni Islam

Location
- Location: 66 Pheng Geck Avenue, Singapore 348261
- Country: Singapore
- Coordinates: 1.3329822°N 103.8704478°E

Architecture
- Type: Mosque
- Style: Eclecticism in architecture
- Founder: Syed Abdul Rahman Alkaff
- Established: 1920
- Completed: 1932; 2014 (Reconstruction)
- Minaret: 1
- Designated as NHL

National monument of Singapore
- Designated: 19 December 2014; 11 years ago
- Reference no.: 68

Masjid Alkaff Upper Serangoon is a historic mosque located in the Potong Pasir subzone of Toa Payoh, Singapore. Built in 1932 by the prestigious Alkaff family, it features an eclectic architectural style combining European styles and traditional Islamic elements, such as Ottoman architecture. In 2014, the mosque was gazetted as a national monument.

== Background ==
The House of Al-Kaff, more commonly known as the Alkaff family, was a prestigious Arab family in Singapore that had emigrated from Yemen. The Alkaffs were known for their grand constructions throughout colonial Singapore, which included Alkaff Mansion, Alkaff Arcade, and Masjid Alkaff Kampung Melayu. After the Second World War, the Alkaffs decided to return to their trading business and hence sold most of their properties while also releasing the mosques they built as awqaf under the management of the Muslim Endowments Board.

== History ==
In the 1920s, the Alkaff family hired architectural firm Westerhout & Oman to design plans for a proposed mosque to be built near the Serangoon area. A small, temporary surau had already been established at the site in 1920. Although the plans had been drawn up by 1927, construction on the mosque was delayed in 1929 after the death of one of the firm's founders, leaving his remaining partner unable to complete directing the project. The Alkaffs then hired the Swan & Maclaren Group to redesign the mosque from the existing plans. In 1930, Syed Abdul Rahman Alkaff, the patriarch of the family, donated land as awqaf and financed the construction of the mosque, which was completed in 1932 at a cost of $40,000. It was built within close proximity to the Bidadari Cemetery and also served as a replacement when the main mosque serving the cemetery was torn down in 2007 to make way for redevelopments around Woodleigh.

In 2012, the mosque was closed down in order to undergo an extensive renovation to increase the capacity of the main prayer hall. Renovation works were ultimately completed in mid 2014 and the mosque was reopened on 29 March 2014 by Yaacob Ibrahim, the contemporary Minister-in-Charge of Muslim Affairs. The reopened mosque was also gazetted as the sixty-eighth national monument of Singapore on 19 December 2014 by the National Heritage Board. Then on 18 October 2015, the mosque emerged as one of four winners of the Architectural Heritage Award from the Urban Redevelopment Authority (URA). Judges from the URA cited the meticulous attempts to preserve the original mosque building as being the reason for their decision.

== Architecture ==
Masjid Alkaff Upper Serangoon is built in an eclectic style, primarily inspired by European architecture and blending in Moorish and Indo-Saracenic styles. The minaret of the mosque is built in the Ottoman architectureal style, with a fluted balcony and pointed conical dome, all of which are also modelled after minarets of Masjid al-Haram as well. Intricate carvings line the tops of the pillars holding up the main prayer hall of the mosque, while the front of the main prayer hall is adorned by a concrete mihrab and a wooden minbar. The exterior appearance of the mosque is generally the same as it was in 1932, with the exception of colours and an annexe building visible at the back of the mosque. A monumental plaque is also embedded in the front wall of the mosque, having been installed on 16 January 2015 to commemorate the mosque's status as a historic site and national monument.

The mosque has a capacity of 1,200 worshippers. Architectural firm, Shing Design Atelier, was responsible for overseeing and managing the 2014 reconstruction project. Within the rear compound of the mosque is Darul Ihsan Lilbanat, a girls orphanage that serves as the female counterpart to Darul Ihsan Boys' Orphanage that is situated next to another mosque, Masjid Sallim Mattar.

== Gallery ==
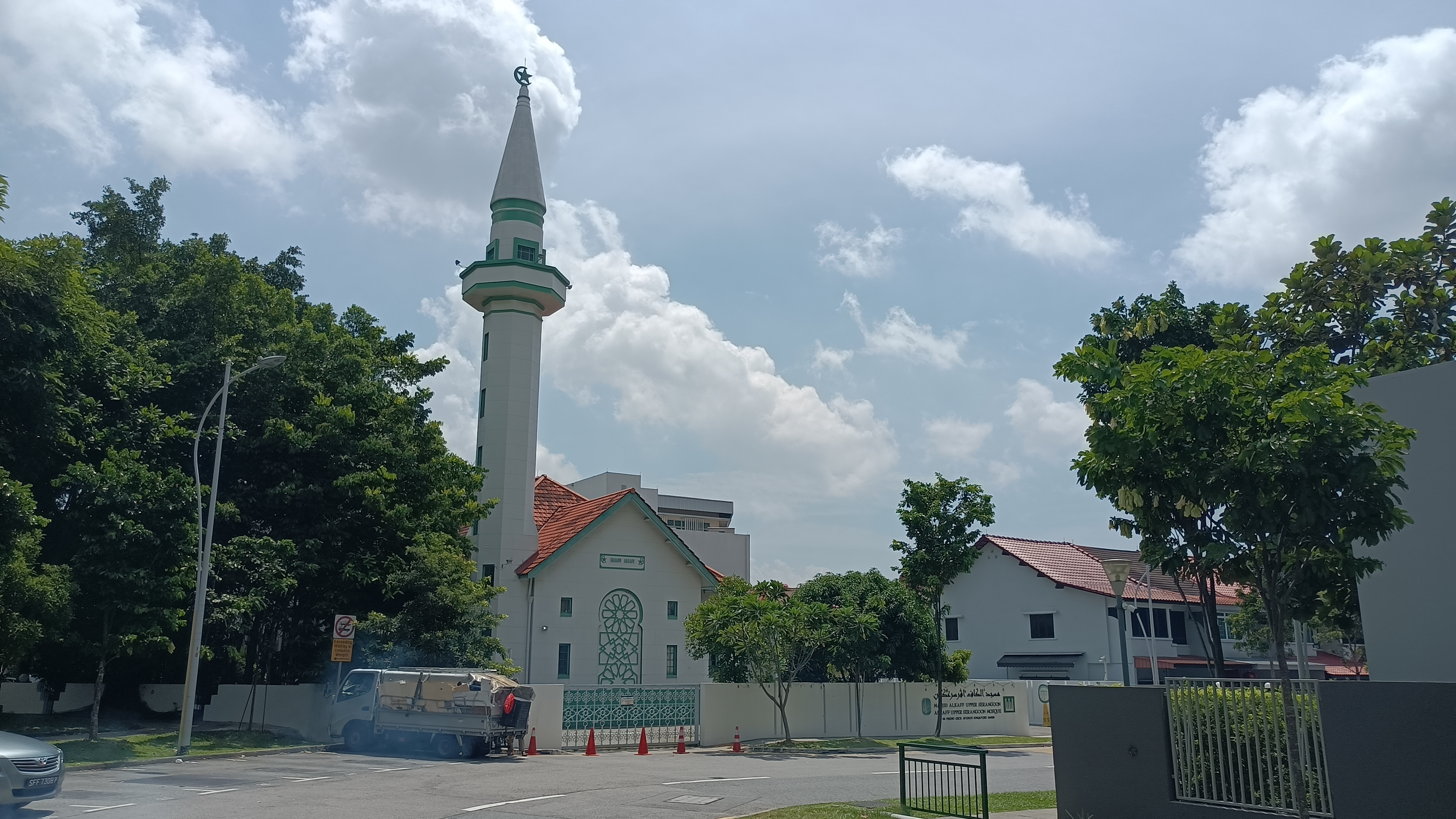
The mosque as seen from the junction of Upper Serangoon Road into Sennett Estate.

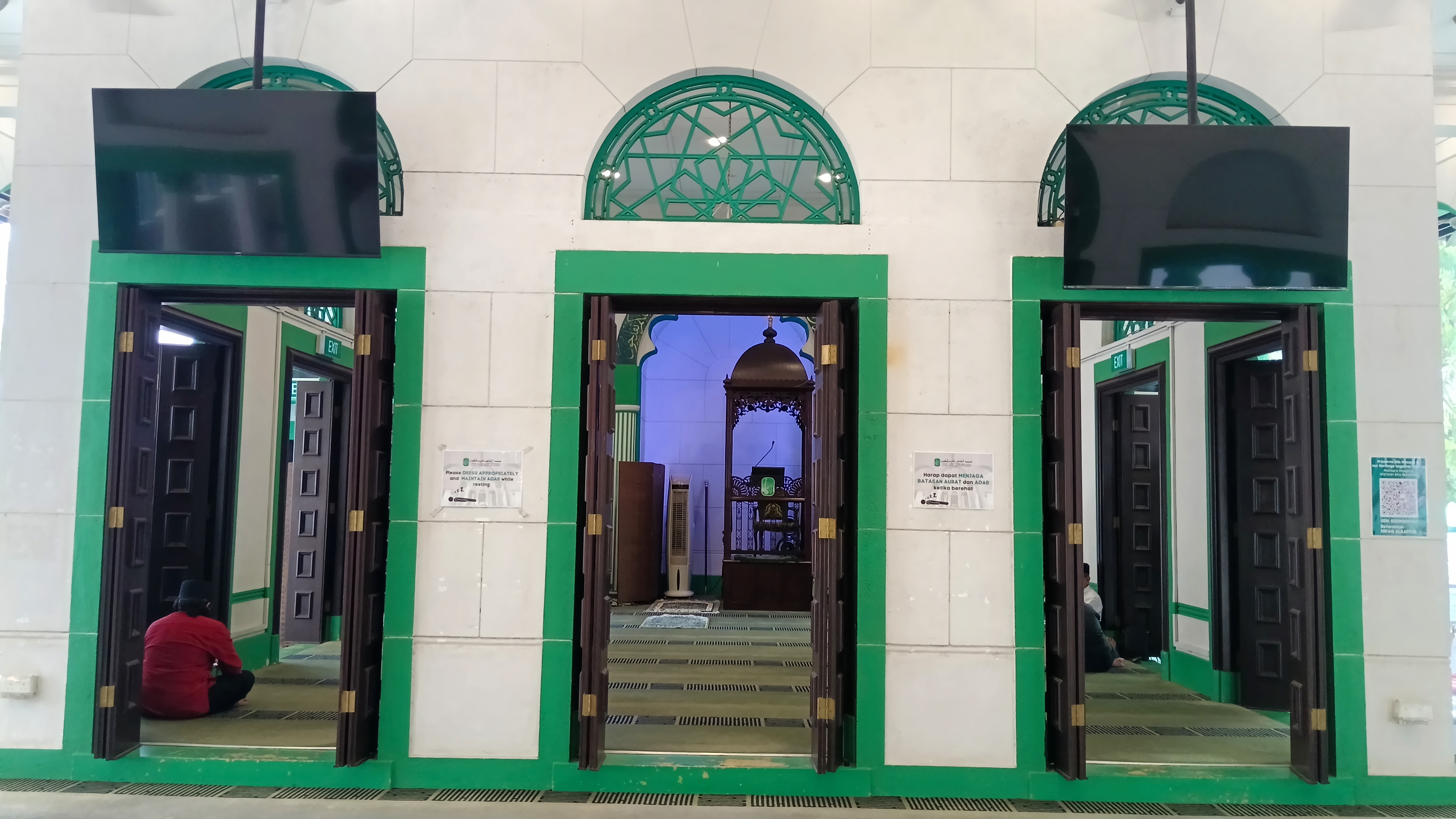
The entrance to the main prayer hall of the mosque.

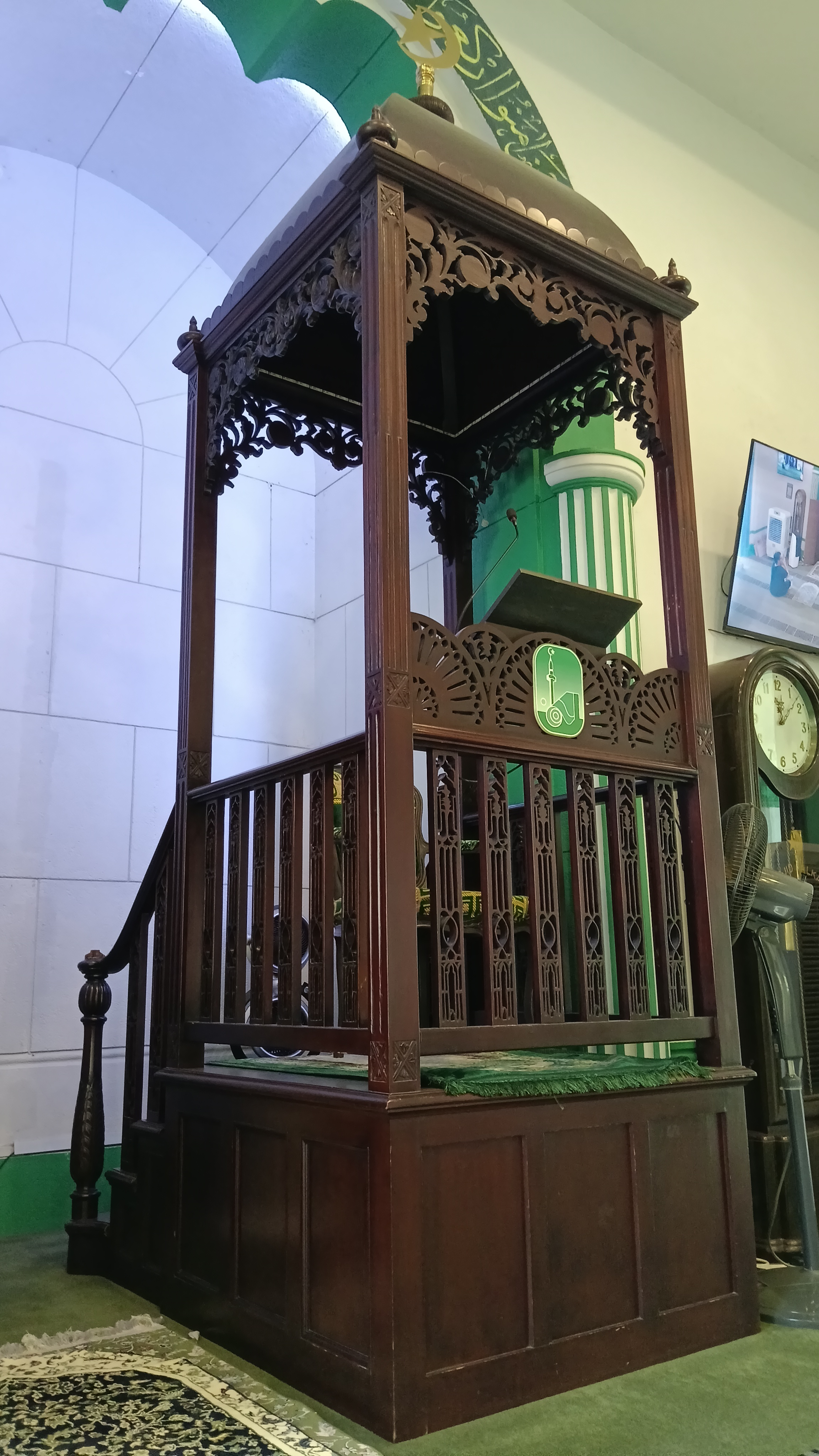
The minbar of the mosque.

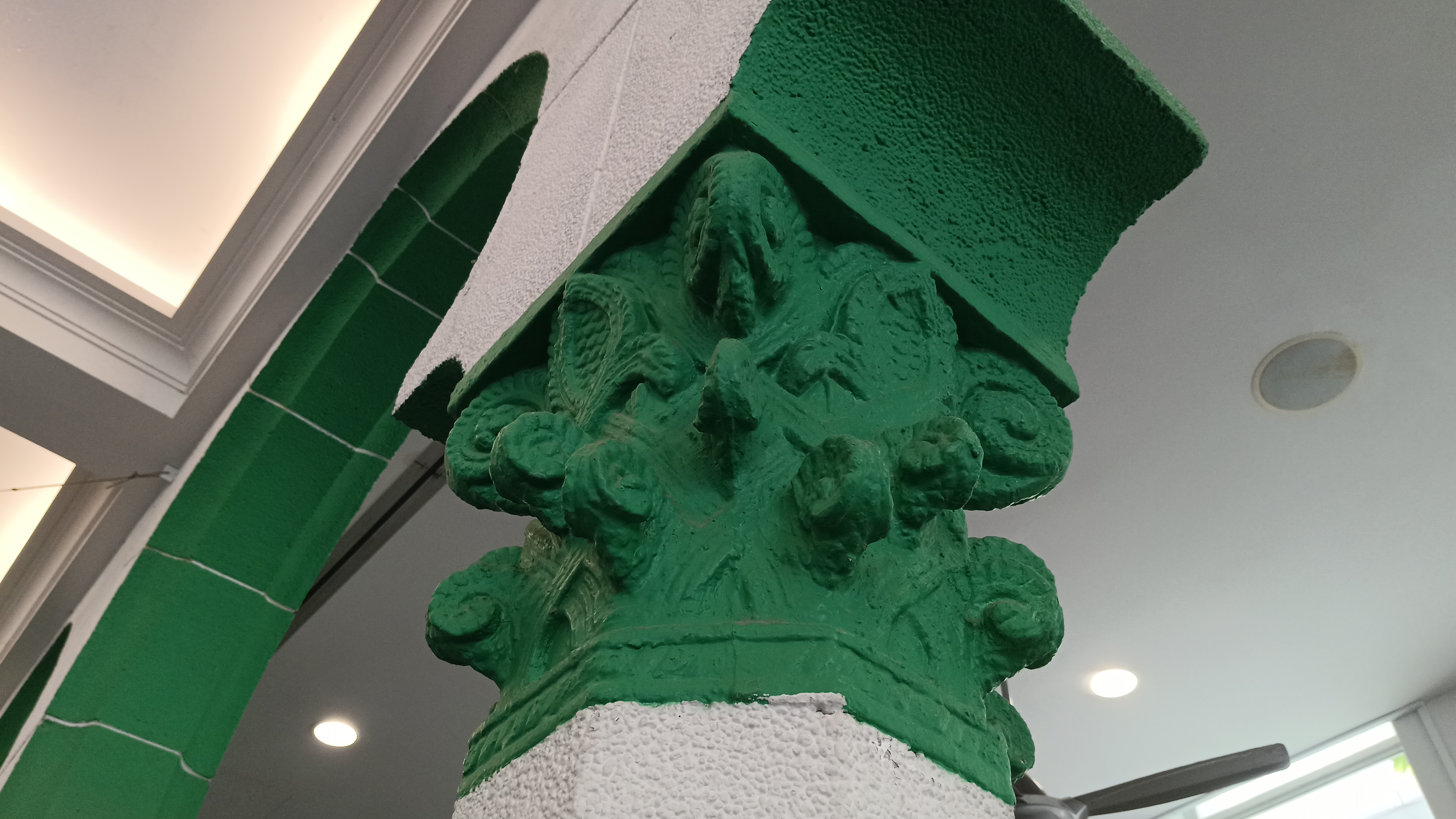
Carvings on a concrete pillar in the main prayer hall.

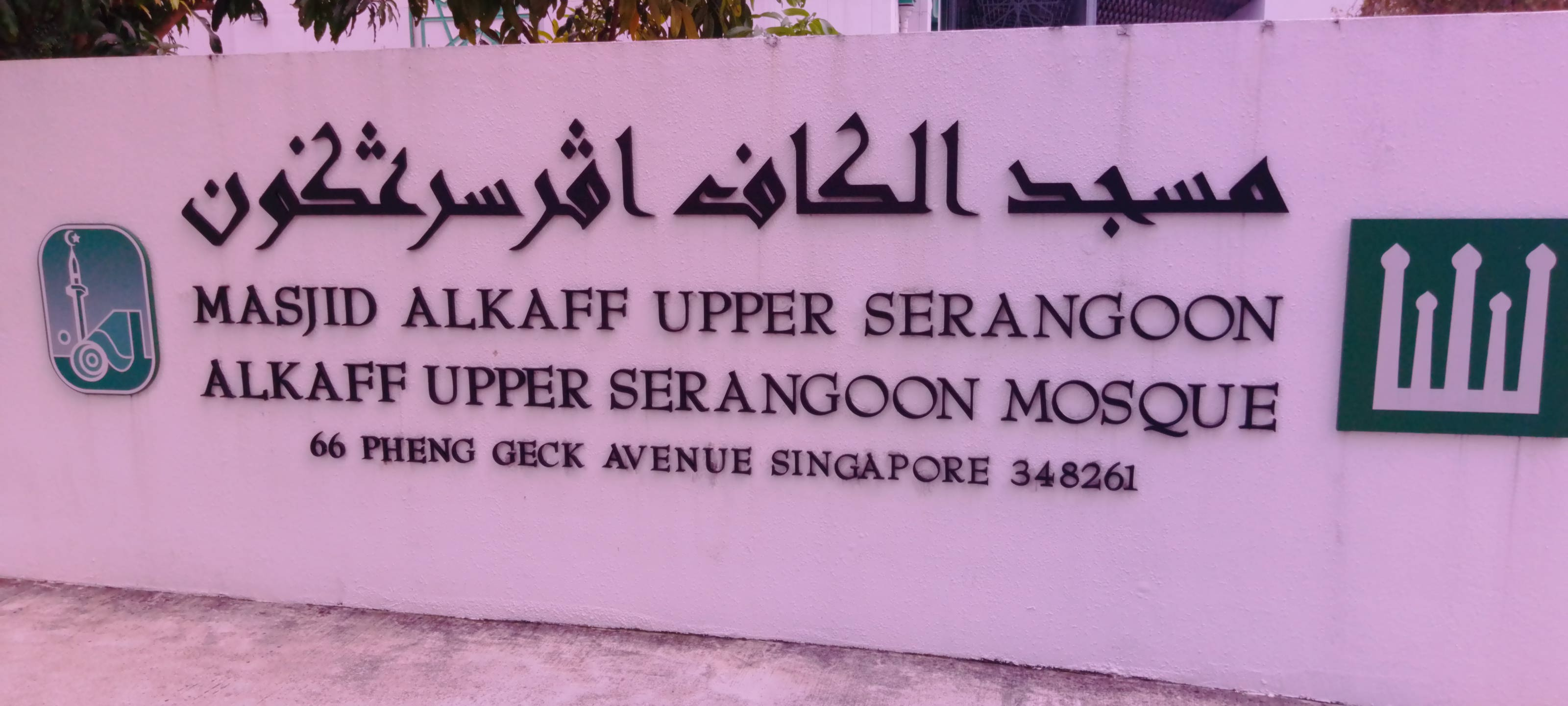
The name of the mosque written in English and Jawi, with a logo of the Majlis Ugama Islam Singapura in the top right and mosque logo on the top left.

== Transportation ==
Situated within the Sennett Estate, consisting of landed houses along Pheng Geck Avenue, Masjid Alkaff Upper Serangoon is accessible from Exit B of the Potong Pasir MRT station, within a 350-metre walking distance.

== See also ==
- List of mosques in Singapore
- National monuments of Singapore
