= Mount Vernon Columbarium =

Columbarium in Singapore

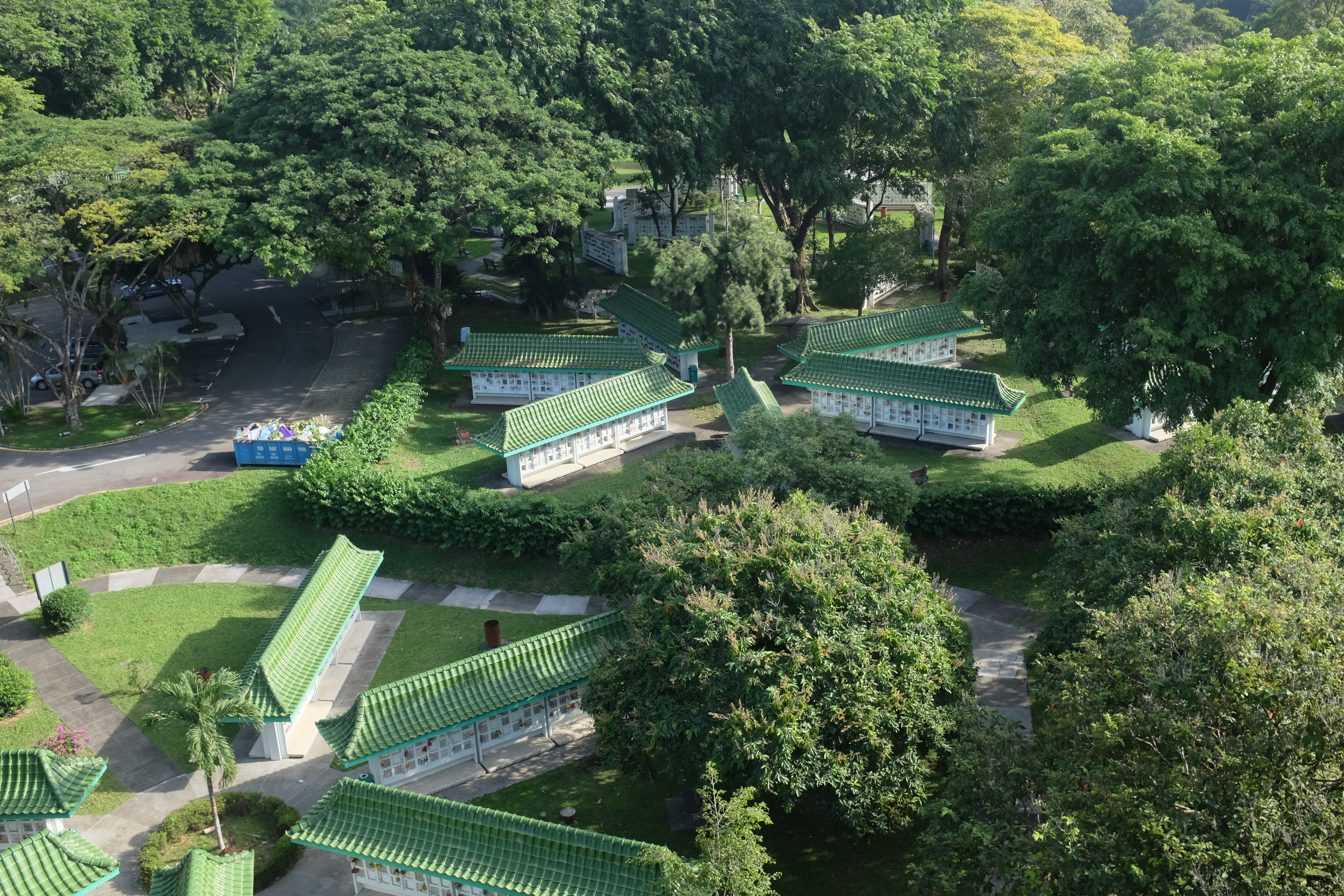
The complex in 2014

Mount Vernon Columbarium was a columbarium complex on Mount Vernon, Singapore. Built in 1962 as a crematorium, the columbarium closed in 2018 to make way for future redevelopments in the upcoming Bidadari housing estate, with plans for a new funeral parlour complex to be completed by 2025.

== History ==
Plans for a new crematorium in the area were first announced in 1954, which was to be built on either Mount Vernon or on Lornie Road overlooking MacRitchie Reservoir. The site on Mount Vernon was previously a multi-religious burial ground. Mount Vernon was selected as the site of the crematorium in May, and was built later that year. The crematorium, known as the Mount Vernon Crematorium, was completed in October 1962, and only had one service hall, holding around four cremations a week. Plans for a $500,000 expansion of the crematorium were announced in May 1974 due to the increasing popularity of cremation. The extension was completed in May 1975, and cost $250,000.

Plans were also made in 1974 to build a columbarium with 3,000 niches. The first phase of the project would comprise fifteen blocks, each containing 200 niches. The columbarium opened in 1976, with only 161 niches occupied in the first year. Two funeral parlours and embalming rooms were opened in April 1978 due to the lack of space for funerals in public housing estates. The complex cost $300,000 to build, and was open to people of any religion. In 1978, it cost $30 to cremate the body of a child, and $15 for the bodies of those below the age of 15. In December 1979, it was announced that all of the graves in the Tan Tock Seng Hospital burial ground would be exhumed for cremation at the crematorium.

Plans to expand the columbarium, adding five new cluster of columbaria containing 7,920 additional niches for storing urns containing ashes were announced on 1 November 1981 by then Minister for the Environment Ong Pang Boon. The expansion had been partially completed by January 1983, with 704 more niches ready for use. The extension cost $1.1 million, and added 5,280 more niches to the columbarium. The ability for families to choose which niches they preferred was implemented on 23 December 1983, as some families considered lower niches to be "unfavourable" as they might be touched by brooms while sweeping and might attract more dust. Another extension began construction in June 1985 and ended in September, comprising two clusters of columbaria, adding 2,112 single niches. An extension, which was completed in November 1987, comprised a two-level "church-style" building and a nine-storey Chinese pagoda, and added 13,230 more niches. The pagoda mainly housed niches for Buddhists and Taoists, while the "Church-style" building mainly housed niches for Christians.

Twenty-two funeral parlours were opened in January 2004, which were equipped with multiple facilities, such as DVD machines, amplifiers, speakers, sofa sets, flat-screen TV sets, and kitchenettes. The parlours were operated by Casket Fairprice, a funeral services provider.

In February 2003, the Urban Redevelopment Authority announced that Mount Vernon Columbarium, along with Bidadari Cemetery, would be closed in 2005 to make way for future residential developments in the area. The complex would be replaced by a complex in Mandai, which would be ready in early 2004. By then, the new complex would be the only operating crematorium. In May, it was announced that the crematorium in the complex would close on 30 June 2004. The crematorium in Mandai opened on 1 July, replacing Mount Vernon as the only operating crematorium.

In September 2013, the National Environment Agency announced that the columbarium complex would be demolished to make way for future residential development in the area, as well as Bidadari Park, and would be replaced by the Mount Vernon Funeral Parlour, which was smaller in size. The columbarium was to close after all of the niches had been relocated to either Choa Chu Kang Columbarium or the Mandai Crematorium and Columbarium. The claim and registration process for the niches began on 28 October 2015. In April 2015, the funeral parlours had their leases extended by two years. The leases were further extended to March 2018 in December 2016. On 9 January 2018, the National Environment Agency announced that the new funeral parlour would begin construction in the second half of 2021, and would be operational by 2024. The columbarium would close in September, causing there to be twenty percent fewer funeral halls available in Singapore. The completion date of the new funeral parlour complex was later delayed to 2025.

Mount Vernon Columbarium closed on 30 September 2018.

== Notable cremations ==
Death Year	Name	Notes
1967	Lee Kong Chian	Philanthropist and multi-millionaire businessman
1974	Nazir Ahmad Mallal	Lawyer and former Progressive Party legislative councillor
1980	Chua Jim Neo	Mother of 1st Prime Minister Lee Kuan Yew
1982	Wong Ming Yang	The first wife of 3rd Prime Minister Lee Hsien Loong
1983	Hon Sui Sen	Minister for Finance
1988	Tan Teck Chwee	Former chairman of the Public Service Commission
1992	Fong Sip Chee	Veteran Singaporean politician and Minister of State for Culture
1995	Ye Fong	Renowned Singaporean comedian and half of the duo 'Ah Pui & Ah San'
1996	Lim Chin Siong	Left-wing politician and trade union leader
1997	Lee Chin Koon	Father of 1st Prime Minister Lee Kuan Yew
1998	Wang Sa	Renowned Singaporean comedian and half of the duo 'Ah Pui & Ah San'
1999	Punch Coomaraswamy	Former High Court judge, Speaker Of Parliament and envoy
2001	E. W. Barker	Former Law Minister and lawyer
2002	Ong Teng Cheong	5th President of Singapore
2004	Heng Yeow Pheow	LTA foreman who sacrificed his life saving his colleague during the Nicoll Highway collapse
