= House of Al-Kaff =

Family of Arab Singaporeans of Yemeni origin

House of Al-Kaff آل الكاف
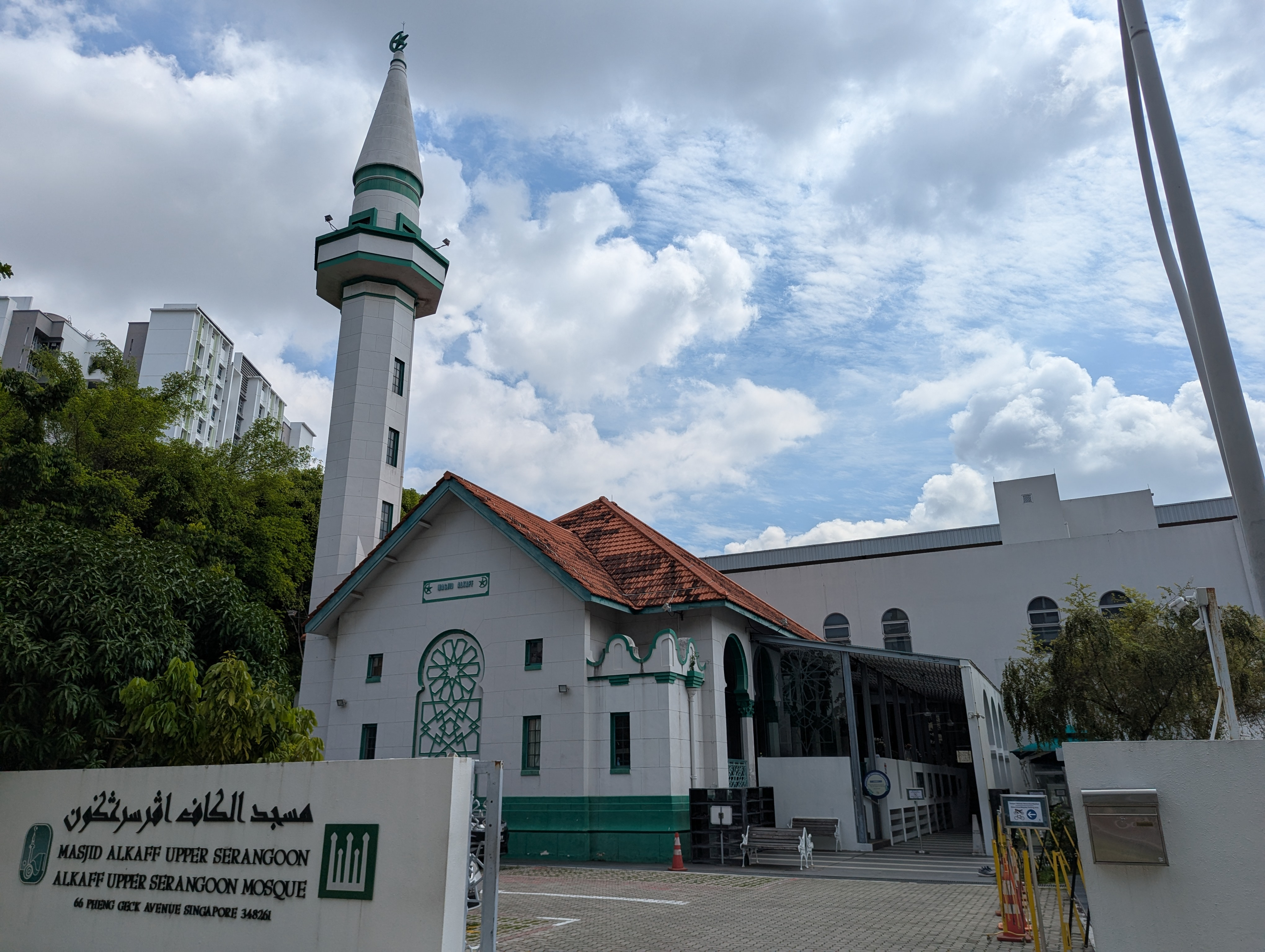
- The 68th national monument, Masjid Alkaff Upper Serangoon was established by the Alkaff family in 1920.
- Ethnicity: Hadhrami Arab
- Location: Yemen, Singapore
- Religion: Sunni Islam

The House of Al-Kaff (Arabic: الكاف; transliterated as al-Kāf) is a Hadhrami Arab family who served as merchants, traders, and property developers in Singapore. They originated from Yemen and arrived as diaspora in Singapore in 1852. Among the monuments named after them include the Al-Kaff Mansion at Telok Blangah and the Masjid Al-Kaff Kampung Melayu at Bedok.

== History ==
The first recorded arrival of Al-Kaff in Singapore was in the year 1852. They hailed from the coast of Yemen. One of the first members of the family to arrive on the shores of Singapore was Shaikh Alkaff, whom the family is mostly named after. The Alkaffs, who were formerly spice traders, earned a reputation for their wealth which they spent on the construction of buildings such as houses, mansions and mosques.

In 1909, the Al-Kaff Arcade at Collyer Quay was erected, with funding from the Alkaffs themselves. In 1918, they built the al-Kaff Mansion which is located at Telok Blangah. Aside from commercial and residential buildings, the al-Kaff family also funded the construction of mosques including the Masjid al-Kaff Upper Serangoon, the 68th national monument of Singapore. They also owned some land within the Bidadari Cemetery and built a mosque within the space owned by them for Muslim congregants at the cemetery.

In terms of social relations, the Alkaffs had friendly relations with the American-born citizens living in Singapore. They fraternized with other businessmen, including Rajabali Jumabhoy, a founding member of the Singapore Indian Association. The Alkaffs also had relations with the Alsagoffs, which was another Singaporean Arab family.

After World War II, the Alkaffs suffered from financial losses and hence were forced to sell off some of their properties, including the al-Kaff Mansion.

== Members ==
Sayyid Abubakr bin Shaikh Al-Kaff (c. 1890–1965), who was a Yemeni pacifist and philanthropist. In 1936, Al-Kaff assisted British colonial administrator Harold Ingrams in brokering a three-year truce between warring Qu'aiti and Kathiri tribes.

== Monuments ==
=== al-Kaff Arcade ===
The al-Kaff Arcade, built in 1909 by the Alkaffs, was a Moorish-style shopping center along Collyer Quay. Designed by Donald McLeod Craik, it featured onion domes and a Victorian facade, making it a waterfront landmark. Sold in 1973 and demolished in 1978, its site is now home to the modern Arcade complex.

=== al-Kaff Mansion ===
al-Kaff Mansion is a colonial-era bungalow in Singapore, built in 1918 and located at Telok Blangah. It had two stories and it was where the Alkaffs hosted events and parties. Abandoned after World War II, it was subsequently restored in the 1980s and has since served as a restaurant and event venue.

=== al-Kaff Gardens ===
The al-Kaff Gardens were established in the 1930s as a Japanese garden and served as a tourist attraction as well. It was demolished in 1964 in order to build more schools to make educational facilities more accessible for children islandwide. However, the residential area west of the former park site has been named after the Alkaffs.

=== Masjid al-Kaff Upper Serangoon ===
Masjid al-Kaff Upper Serangoon was established in 1920 but ultimately completed in 1932. The construction of the mosque was funded by the Alkaffs, while the mosque itself was designed by notable architecture firm, Swan & MacLaren. The mosque was also gazetted as the 68th national monument of Singapore in 2014 before winning an award for its architecture in 2015.

=== Masjid Alkaff ===
Built in 1932, the Masjid al-Kaff stood at Kaki Bukit, a district now part of the Bedok neighbourhood. Construction of the mosque was financed by Syed Ahmad al-Kaff as well as Bugis merchant, Ambo Sooloh. Due to redevelopment projects in the Bedok area, Masjid al-Kaff was demolished in the 1980s. However, it was replaced by Masjid al-Kaff Kampung Melayu that was officialized in 1995.

Former residents of Bedok described the now-demolished Masjid al-Kaff as resembling a Hindu temple in architectural style. An image of the old mosque can be seen in a 1994 article.

=== Masjid Bidadari ===
Masjid Bidadari, or the Bidadari Mosque, was built in 1932 with funding from a member of the Alkaffs. The mosque served congregants and worshippers at the Bidadari Cemetery. In 2007, the mosque was demolished during the exhumation and relocation of Bidadari Cemetery in order to establish the Bidadari residential estate.

== See also ==
- Alsagoff family
- Aljunied family
- List of mosques in Singapore
