= Edward Walter Gunatilaka =

Sri Lankan wharf manager

Edward Walter Gunatilaka (1864 - 3 September 1930), was a wharf manager for P&O in Singapore, a Justice of the Peace, and president of the Sinhalese Association of Malaya.

== Biography ==
Gunatilaka was born in Sri Lanka on 1864, as the son of M. Gunatilaka Mudaleyar. His brother was Piraj Viraj Vejakich. He came to Singapore some years before joining the Peninsular and Oriental Steam Navigation Company in 1881. He also became the confidential secretary of Sir John Anderson.

Gunatilaka was made a Justice of the Peace in 1924, along with S. Muttucumaru, and a Visiting Justice to the prisons in the settlement. He was the president of the Sinhalese Association of Malaya. He was a committee member of the Raffles College building fund, an honorary treasurer of St. Matthew's Church, and a member of the board of St. Andrew's Mission Hospital.

Gunatilaka retired from his position as a wharf manager for the Peninsular and Oriental Steam Navigation Company on 22 January 1926, after spending 38 years with the company.

== Personal life ==
Gunatilaka married Florence Gertrude. Together, he and his wife had several children. His wife died on 12 August 1923.

Gunatilaka died on 3 September 1930 at his residence on 46 Stevens Road. His funeral was held on the next day in Bidadari Cemetery.
