= Edwy Lyonet Talma =

Colonial Administrator

- Born: 1874; Barbados
- Died: July 6, 1930 (aged 55–56); Singapore
- Occupations: Colonial administrator and lawyer

Edwy Lyonet Talma (1874 – 6 July 1930) was a colonial administrator and lawyer who served in the civil service of the Straits Settlements from 1896 to 1924.

== Early life and education ==
Edwy Lyonet Talma was born in Barbados in 1874, and received his early education at Harrison College, Barbados. He then went to Christ's College, Cambridge, obtained his BA, and was admitted to the Inner Temple as a member of the English bar.

== Career ==
In 1896, Talma went to Penang as a cadet in the civil service of the Straits Settlements and filled various appointments including Second Magistrate and Commissioner of Court of Requests, Superintendent of Immigrants and acting Postmaster General, before moving to Singapore in 1904 to take up the position of Deputy Registrar in the Supreme Court. There he occupied various positions including, assistant superintendent of Indian Immigrants, assistant registrar of joint stock companies, collector of land revenue, district judge and magistrate until 1917 when he was sent to work in Somerset House in London. After returning to Singapore he joined the War Tax Office before being appointed Collector-General, and in 1920 was appointed Registrar of the Supreme Court, promoted to Deputy Colonial Treasurer, whilst also acting as secretary to the Hindu and Islamic Endowment Board, and sitting on the Legislative and Executive Councils.

Talma retired from the Malayan civil service in 1924 and joined Battenberg as a partner, practising as an advocate in the local courts, the firm becoming known as Battenberg & Talma. At the same time he served as a member of the municipal commission.

Talma was a keen sportsman who played cricket for the Singapore Club team and captained the Penang team. He was also the first captain of the Racecourse Golf Club.

== Death and legacy ==
Talma died on 6 July 1930 in Singapore whilst playing golf. He was buried at Bidadari Cemetery.

Talma Road in Singapore is named after him.
