= Masjid Sallim Mattar =

Mosque located in MacPherson, Singapore

- Jawi: مسجد سليم مطر
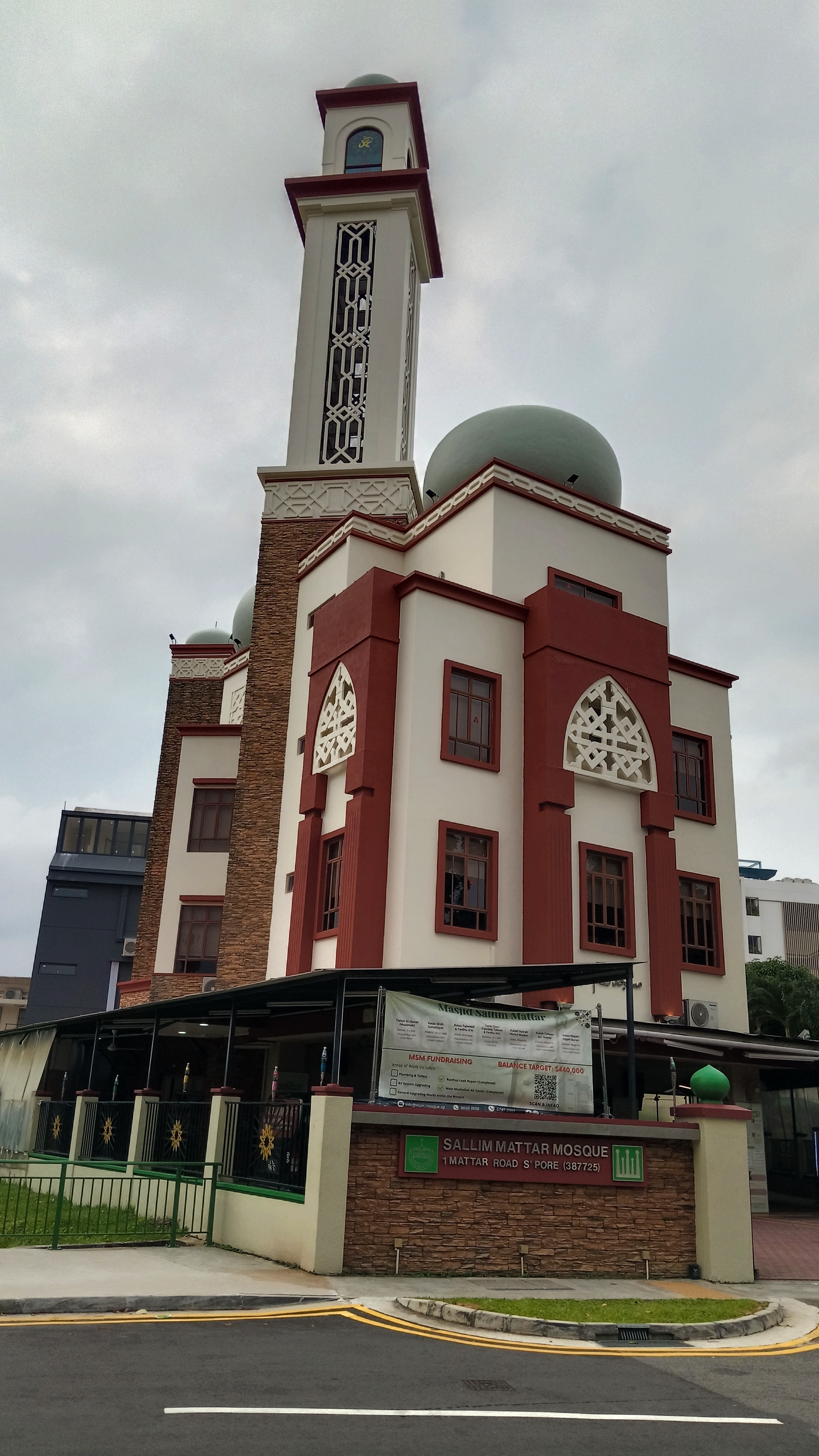
- Masjid Sallim Mattar seen from along Mattar Road.

- Location in Singapore

Religion
- Affiliation: Sunni Islam

Location
- Location: 1 Mattar Road, Singapore 387725
- Country: Singapore
- Coordinates: 1.3256728°N 103.8812336°E

Architecture
- Established: 1935
- Completed: 2007 (reconstruction)

Specifications
- Capacity: 1,000
- Dome: 2
- Minaret: 1

Masjid Sallim Mattar is a mosque located along Mattar Road in MacPherson, Singapore. Built in 1935, it is named after its founder, Sheikh Sallim bin Taha Mattar, who endowed land and assets for the construction of the mosque. Next to it is the Darul Ihsan Boys Orphanage, an orphanage for male Muslim children, that is conjoined with the mosque building.

== History ==
In the late 1920s, an Arab merchant named Sheikh Salim bin Taha Mattar endowed land for the construction of a mosque in the MacPherson neighborhood and later helped to gather further funds from locals to construct the mosque. The mosque was completed in 1935 as a simple single-storey structure that featured a carpeted floor and wooden roof. The road leading to the mosque was also renamed to Mattar Road after Sheikh Salim Mattar. Between 1950 and 1970, the village houses that surrounded the mosque were demolished to make way for private condominiums, while the usual visitors of the mosque would be relocated to redeveloped spaces in the wider Geylang planning area. In 1976, plans were considered for reconstructing the mosque to improve its sanitary and ablution facilities, as well as expand the capacity of the mosque, which could only fit at least three hundred worshippers at the time for Jummah and festive prayers.

An Islamic advisory board, the Muslim Trust Fund Association (MTFA), built an orphanage next to the mosque in 1962. The orphanage, named Darul Ihsan Boys Orphanage, served as a male counterpart to the Darul Ihsan Lilbanat that was attached to the Alkaff Mosque at Potong Pasir. In 1991, plans to incorporate the mosque and orphanage into a larger Islamic religious centre were unveiled by the mosque committee. However, these plans were not approved by the governmental authorities, hence the mosque and orphanage were to be kept as separate structures during their reconstructions. Once the plans for rebuilding had received approval, the Majlis Ugama Islam Singapura (MUIS) posted a notice in The Straits Times newspaper on 29 June 2001, indicating a "proposed demolition and erection of a four-storey Salim Mattar Mosque."

Starting from August 2001, the mosque was closed to the public. It was demolished and rebuilt from the ground up into a larger four-storey structure with two domes and a minaret, with a new capacity of a thousand worshippers. The new mosque was then reopened in 2007, along with the orphanage next to it. The descendants of Sheikh Sallim Mattar were also present at the reopening ceremony to give their feedback on the new mosque. It was later selected as one of 15 mosques to undergo the Mosque Upgrading Program, an initiative by the MUIS.

== Transportation ==
Masjid Sallim Mattar is situated along Mattar Road and is within walking distance from the Mattar MRT station on the Downtown Line.

== See also ==
- Masjid Alkaff Upper Serangoon
- List of mosques in Singapore
