= Istana Bidadari =

Defunct palace in Bidadari, Singapore

Bidadari Palace
- Istana Bidadari
- Interactive map of the Bidadari Palace area

General information
- Status: Demolished
- Location: Bidadari, Singapore, Straits Settlements, Singapore, Straits Settlements
- Coordinates: 1.34027°N 103.87809°E
- Named for: Bidadari
- Completed: 1850s
- Closed: 1902
- Demolished: 1915
- Owner: Henry Minchin Simons (former); William Napier (former); Zubaidah binte Abdullah (former)
- Landlord: Henry Minchin Simons (former); William Napier (former); Abu Bakar (former)
- Affiliation: State of Johor

Istana Bidadari was a palace once located within the Bidadari Cemetery in Singapore from the late-1850s to 1915.

== History ==
An estate of about 45-acre in Singapore was first acquired by the British civil engineer Henry Minchin Simons in 1855, there he had the house built between 1855 and 1861. He later exchanged the estate with William Napier for his Tyersall estate.

The estate was subsequently sold to Temenggong Abu Bakar in the mid-1860s and he gave it to his second wife, the Danish woman Enche' Puan Besar Zubaidah binti Abdullah who was born Cecilia Catharina Lange, for her residence. Thus the estate was known as Bidadari and house was known as Istana Bidadari, in reference to the beauty of the Temenggong's wife as compared to the fairies. Temenggong Abu Bakar would spend much for his time there with his wife, although his main residence was at Tyersall.

Istana Bidadari was noted to be the birthplaces of Maharaja of Johor Abu Bakar and Zubaidah's daughter Tengku Mariam Al-Marhum, born on 21 December 1871, and son, Ibrahim Al-Marhum, his eventual successor, who was born on 17 September 1873.

After her husband Abu Bakar proclaimed as the Sultan of Johor in 1885, Sultana Zubaidah moved to Johor and the former palace was rented out to various parties, including the Austro-Hungarian Consul in 1889.

In 1902, the Municipal Commissioners officially declared the acquisition of 26 hectares of the estate to be used as a cemetery, which would be named after the estate's name. The Bidadari Cemetery was officially opened on 1 January 1908.

The former palace was demolished in 1915.
