= Masjid Alkaff Kampung Melayu =

Mosque located in Bedok, Singapore

Masjid Alkaff Kampung Melayu مسجد الكاف كامبونغ ملايو
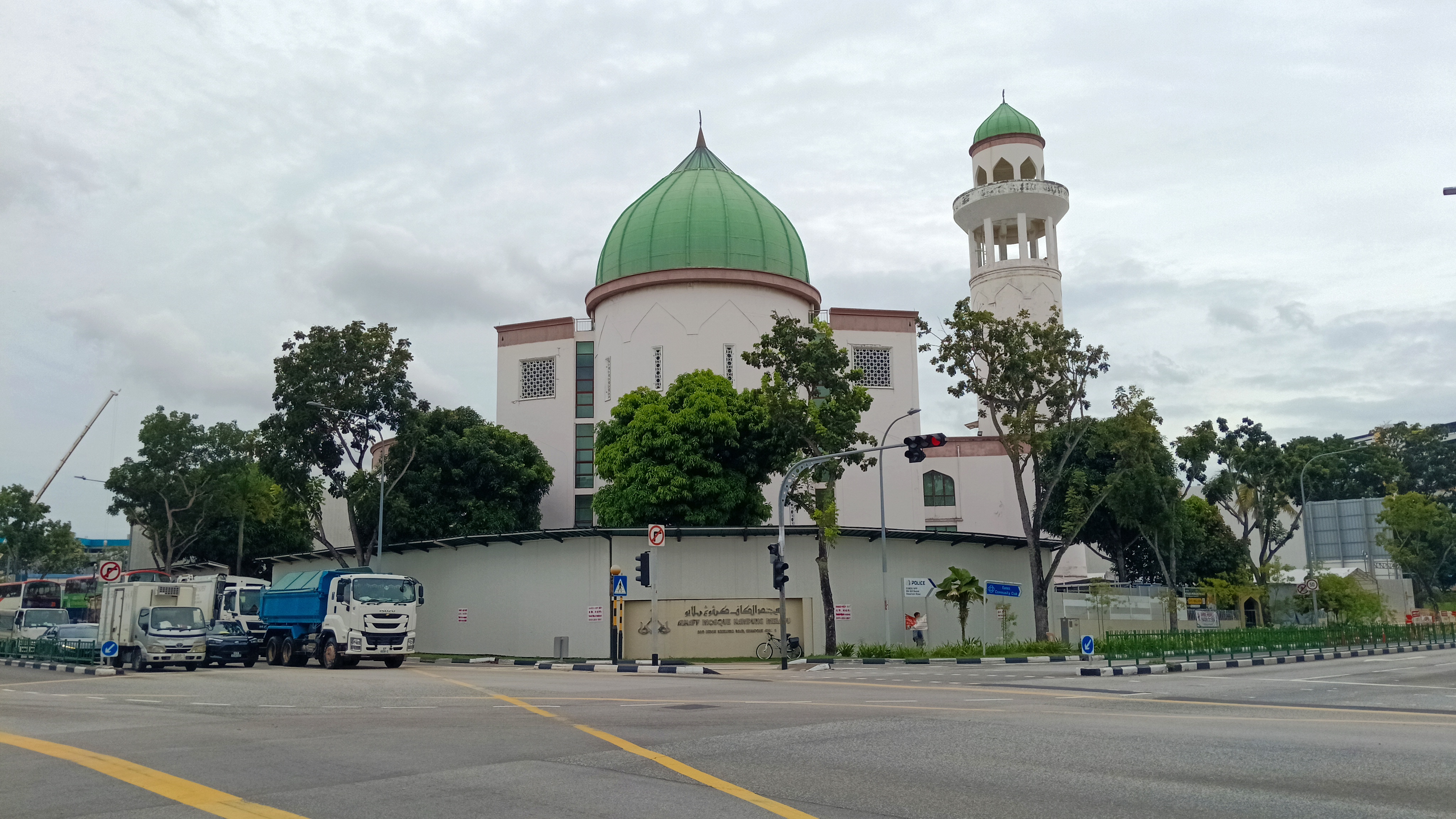

- Location in Singapore

Religion
- Affiliation: Sunni Islam

Location
- Location: 200 Bedok Reservoir Road, Singapore 479221
- Country: Singapore
- Interactive map of Masjid Alkaff Kampung Melayu مسجد الكاف كامبونغ ملايو
- Coordinates: 1.3367169°N 103.9139006°E

Architecture
- Type: Mosque
- Style: Malay architecture Mughal architecture
- Completed: 1994

Specifications
- Minaret: 1
- Minaret height: 24 metres

Masjid Alkaff Kampung Melayu (Jawi: مسجد الكاف كامبونغ ملايو) is a mosque located in Bedok, Singapore. Built in 1994, it is named in memory of an earlier mosque which stood along a now expunged road, Jalan Abdul Manan. Currently undergoing an intensive renovation, the present-day mosque stands at the junction of Kaki Bukit Avenue and Bedok Reservoir Road.

== History ==
The groundbreaking ceremony for the mosque was held on 4 January 1992. The mosque was intended as a tribute to Masjid Alkaff, an older and smaller mosque built by the influential Alkaff family which was located along a now expunged road, Jalan Abdul Manan, and had to be demolished to make way for redevelopments. The committee for the mosque had been formed a few years earlier on 30 December 1989 back when the old Masjid Alkaff was still functional. The construction process took two years and in late 1994, the mosque was completed with its official opening in December. However, the official inauguration for the mosque took place a year later, in 1995. The mosque was built in a modern architectural style which incorporated mixed elements from Malay and Mughal architecture.

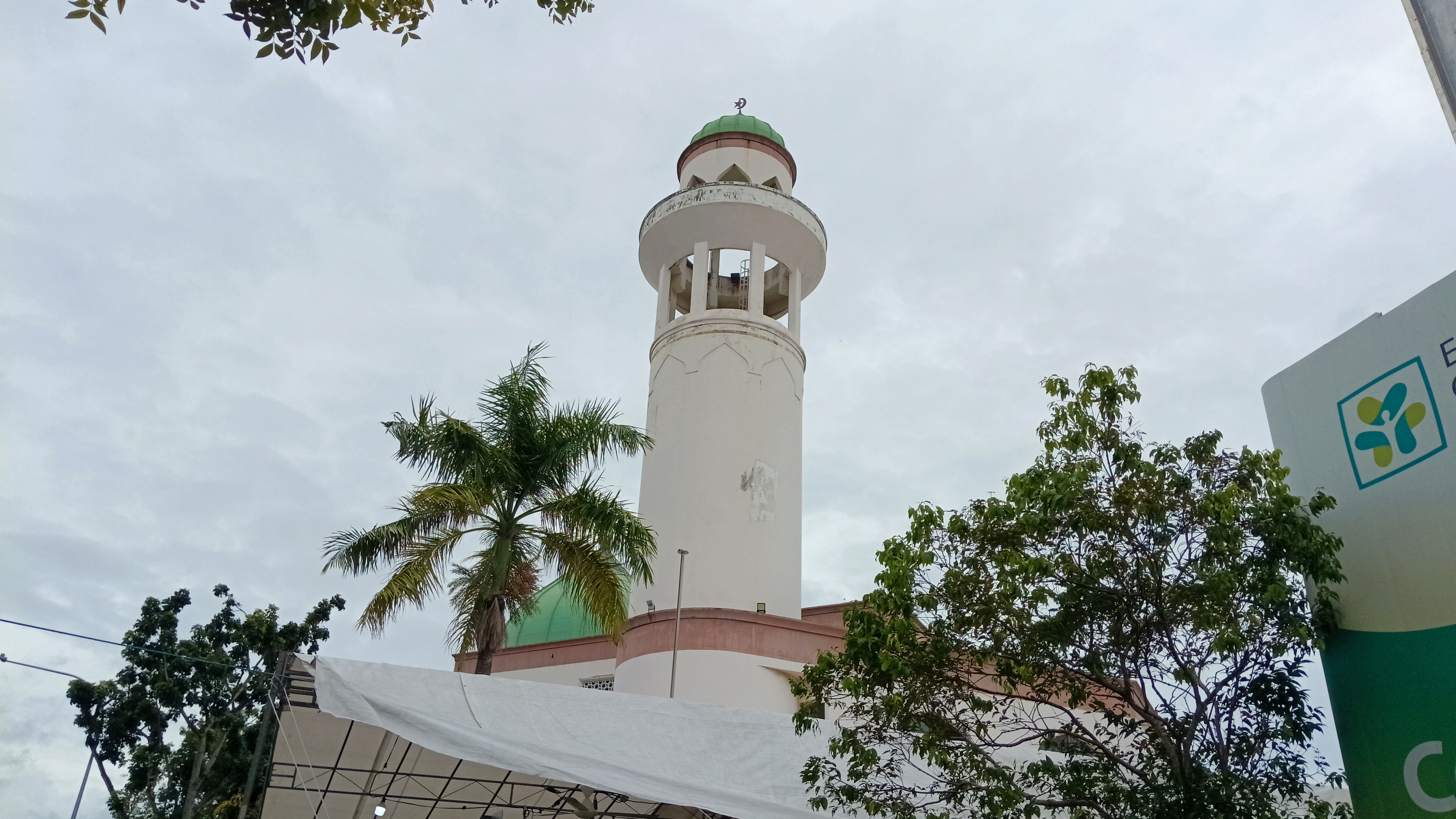
The minaret of Masjid Alkaff Kampung Melayu.

In 2025, Minister-in-charge of Muslim Affairs, Muhammad Faishal Ibrahim, announced that Masjid Alkaff Kampung Melayu would be undergoing an extensive renovation to increase its capacity. After the announcement, Ibrahim himself visited the mosque to interact with worshippers. As the mosque itself is partially closed to allow space for construction work, a temporary surau has been built next to the actual mosque to serve as a place for worshippers to conduct their prayers. The renovation of the mosque is currently still ongoing.

== Transportation ==
Masjid Alkaff Kampung Melayu is directly accessible from the Bedok North MRT station on the Downtown Line. An alternative but longer route would be from the Kaki Bukit MRT station from the same line.

== See also ==
- List of mosques in Singapore
