= Alkaff Mansion =

Mansion in Singapore

Coordinates: 1.27897°N 103.81324°E

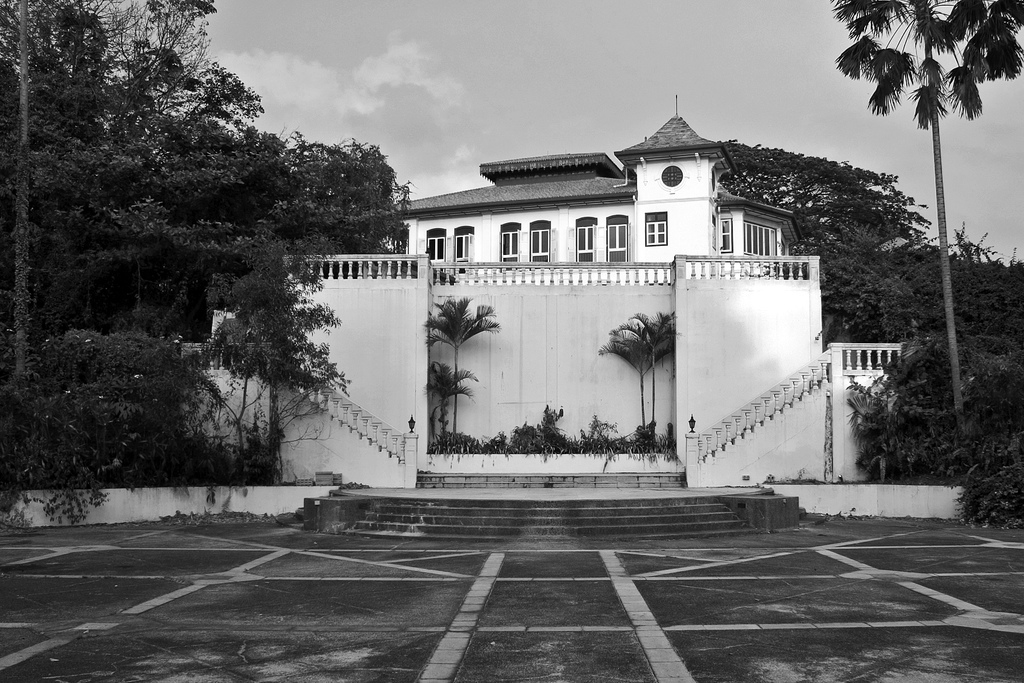
- The mansion in 2006

Alkaff Mansion is an early 20th-century colonial bungalow located within the Telok Blangah Hill Park in Singapore. The hill was originally called Mt Washington, and was part of a sprawling land estate owned by a wealthy Arab Syed Shaikh bin Abdul Rahman Alkaff. Around 1918, Syed Shaikh Alkaff built the bungalow as his primary residence which he abandoned after World War II. The property was later acquired by the government.

Alkaff Mansion was subsequently tendered and awarded to food and beverage company LES, which occupied it from 2011 to 2016. In 2018, the tender for Alkaff Mansion was awarded to Jardin Enchante Pte Ltd by the Singapore Land Authority. "The Alkaff Mansion" under the 1-Group collective of lifestyle F&B concepts, now houses three dining concepts: Wildseed Café, 1918 Heritage Bar and UNA (a refined Spanish restaurant previously at One Rochester). The Alkaff Mansion began operations and was open to the public between April – May 2019.

== History ==
Before 1916

The area known as Telok Blangah Hill today was known as Mount Washington in the early 20th century. A European house was already constructed on the site surrounded by rubber and coconut trees before the plot of land was purchased by Syed Abdul Rahman bin Abdullah Alkaff in 1916.

1918–1930s

In 1918, the mansion with its distinctive architecture was constructed. Throughout the 1920s and 1930s, the mansion hosted many social functions that included people of various races and social classes. These functions had a role in strengthening inter-communal bonds. In 1930, a newspaper report mentions that the mansion was used by an organization called the "Young Arabs" to host a team of amateur Malay footballers who recently won the 1930 Singapore Cup. This event was explicitly reported to be one hosted to help relieve Arab-Malay tensions and bolster Muslim solidarity following a recent misunderstanding.

In 1936, the Chinese community, through the Chinese Consul General, made full use of the building to host a visiting general and provincial governor from China. In this function, a dinner was held and attended by people of various linguistic groups (to the point of necessitating a translator). A press conference was also held, whereby the Chinese governor expressed his "appreciation of the unity of the Chinese in Singapore". These events which cut across racial lines are significant as they call into question the theories of Colonial scholar John Sydenham Furnivall, who argued that British ruled colonial societies were 'plural societies' – societies divided along communal lines that only converged at the market place, or in violence and instability once the ambit of British colonial power was gone. The various communities, far from being totally segregated met at the mansion, and such meetings were entirely spontaneous without explicit support of the British. The antecedents of "racial and religious harmony" which dominates race discourse in present-day Singapore, thus found expression in the mansion.

The mansion also served as a space that empowered women. In a 1936 newspaper section called "Women's interests", an article written by a lady who expressed her deep impressions of the mansion. In her account, women regularly served as joint hosts with their husbands in various social functions. This is contrasted starkly against the fact that women were, at the same time banned from other areas like the "sacred precincts of the Swimming club". In a time of patriarchy, such a role could be seen as an example where women were not mere inert members of society, but active ones who made good use of their agency. The writer also listed the various women who attended social gatherings, often with descriptions of how they gracefully conducted themselves. In one occasion, the author even praised the musical skills of a female guest. The mansion thus served as a site where women could find their voice and express themselves – notions which are often elusive in male-dominated histories.

Circa 1942–1970s

What happened to the mansion during the Japanese occupation years and its aftermath remain relatively unknown. During the war, Telok Blangah Hill was located along the same ridge that hosted the climactic Battle of Pasir Panjang. One could wager a guess that the mansion was abandoned for safety reasons. In any case, the mansion was abandoned after the war. According to the heritage description plaque found at the mansion today, the house was sold as the Alkaffs were facing severe business losses. The identity of those who took over the mansion is unknown.

Following the sale of the mansion, the heritage plaque immediately moves on to mention that the mansion was acquired by the government in 1984. Not only is such information misleading, it also masks the incredibly rich history of the building in the intermediate years.

The mansion was in fact taken over by a Buddhist organization called the "World Buddhist Society". The exact date in which they moved in is unknown, but it is most likely after the year 1972 as a newspaper report on the mansion during that year mentions that the mansion was still abandoned. In any case, pictorial evidence will show that the World Buddhist Society had installed their signboard onto the front façade of the building. According to various oral history interviews, the society managed 2 temples – one in the immediate vicinity at Telok Blangah Hill, and another bigger one called "Thousand Buddha Temple" at Mount Faber. The organization also managed a statue of the Buddha at Telok Blangah Hill. These oral histories, tell us that these temples were prominent places of worship that proved to also be a popular tourist destination. According to one interview, tourists would visit the temples after climbing up Mount Faber.

Other transnational linkages were forged by the World Buddhist Society. Several newspaper reports mention that the society was to conduct various international conferences annually with other Buddhist societies worldwide. Moreover, the World Buddhist Society also served as the umbrella organization for the World Buddhist College, an educational institution which, according to newspaper reports, aimed to "train all Buddhist monks in Singapore". Taken as a whole, the mansion could thus be said to be a nexus that played an educational role, and where transnational linkages were forged between Buddhist societies worldwide.

1984

These activities would however, come to an end in 1984. As part of the government's plan to redevelop the area for recreational purposes, the temples were slated for to be demolished. The society appealed by the government to incorporate their temples and society into the redevelopment plan, but was rejected as the government claimed that the area was to be used for 'recreational' purposes only. As such, the society vacated the area, had their temples and statues demolished, and relocated elsewhere. The mansion, however, survived, albeit in an abandoned state.

1987

In 1987, the mansion was formally included into plans for redevelopment for the purpose of tourism. Notwithstanding the earlier claims that the temples and the mansion were popular among tourists visiting the area, the mansion was to undergo renovation and redevelopment. A series of photographs stored in the National Archive of Singapore show that the building was developed in a way that maintained its façade: the distinctive turrets remained in place, and the steps of the terrace were retained and refurnished.

1990–2005

The mansion was to be turned into a restaurant and the tender was awarded to Hotel Properties Ptd Ltd, who decided that the restaurant serve rijsttafel, a cuisine that combined Dutch and Indonesian culinary elements. The mansion enjoyed a period of popularity as a place for weddings, and other social functions. According to media reports, the restaurant ceased operations in 2003, and ownership of the mansion was returned to the state. Newspaper reports also speculate that the economic crisis of 2001 and the SARs epidemic in 2003 had caused its downfall. In 2005, the mansion was accorded conservation status by the Urban Redevelopment Authority (URA). As such, the façade and architecture of the mansion has since been guaranteed to be preserved.

2010–2016

Tender for the mansion was auctioned in 2010 and was won by the firm LHN. The mansion underwent another round of renovations and in 2011, the Alkaff Mansion Ristorante serving Italian cuisine was opened. Despite recognition in Michelin publications, skepticism in the restaurant's ability to continue business was expressed in a media report in March 2016. The restaurant would eventually cease operations in July 2016. The restaurant may have overestimated the commercial value of the mansion: it agreed to pay a monthly rental three times the guide amount during the auction of 2010.

2018–present

The Singapore Land Authority took over the property from LHN in 2016 and released a tender in 2018 to lease out the property for the next decade. The mansion was eventually awarded to Jardin Enchante Pte Ltd (operating under the name of 1-Group which owns various other concepts like Monti, Botanico, 1-Altitude, Bee's Knees, Stellar etc.) In 2019. The Alkaff Mansion under the 1-Group's Heritage Properties portfolio, houses three dining concepts: a popular pet-friendly floral café called Wildseed Café, 1918 Heritage Bar - revolving around the rich heritage and culture of the property since its establishment, and UNA - a romantic and refined Spanish restaurant previously at One Rochester which offers contemporary Spanish cuisine with creativity and soul.

The Alkaff Mansion's lower courtyard was also renamed The Grounds of Alkaff and is slated to launch grab-and-go food and drink offerings, alongside fun activities soon. On 10 May 2019, The Alkaff Mansion had already hosted the highest level Ministry of Foreign Affair's meeting between Singapore and Italy and executed a romantic sell-out wedding fair organised by its wedding and events arm, 1-Host. It has also hosted various guests from the World's 50 Best Restaurant Awards in Singapore in June 2019. The Alkaff Mansion has also been awarded the most romantic wedding venue in Singapore by LUXLife Global in the Leaders of Luxury Award in 2022.
