= Bidadari, Singapore =

Bidadari
- Subzone of Toa Payoh Planning Area

Other transcription(s)
  - Chinese: 比达达利 (Simplified) 比達達利 (Traditional)
  - Malay: Bidadari (Rumi) بيداداري (Jawi)
  - Tamil: பிடாடாரி
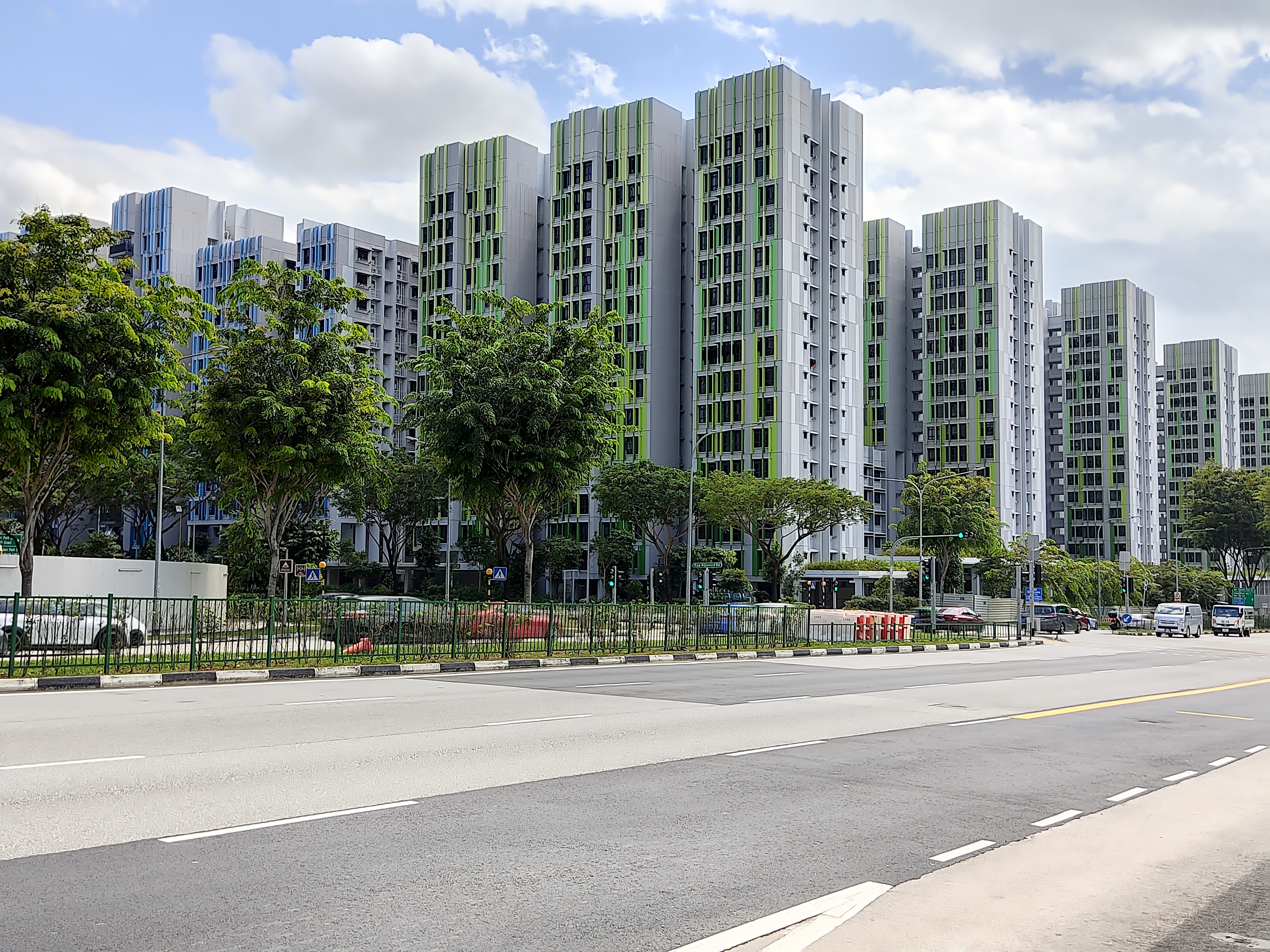
- HDB flats in Bidadari
- Interactive map of Bidadari
- Coordinates: 1°20′15″N 103°52′21″E
- City: Singapore
- Region: Central Region
- Planning Area: Toa Payoh

Area
  - Total: 0.57 km^{2} (0.22 sq mi)

Population (2025)
  - Total: 9,120
  - Density: 16,000/km^{2} (41,000/sq mi)

Bidadari is a housing estate and a subzone of Toa Payoh planning area, in the Central Region of Singapore.

The housing estate is situated at the site of the former Bidadari Cemetery, which served Christian, Muslim, Hindu and Sinhalese communities.

== Etymology ==
The word bidadari means "angel" in Malay, which was in turn derived as a loanword from the Sanskrit word vidhya dhari. The bidadari are depicted as angels that preside over the union of flowers.

== History ==
=== 19th century: Estates and palace ===
During the early 19th century, a 45-acre of estate land in Singapore was first acquired by the British civil engineer Henry Minchin Simons in 1855, and there he had the house built between 1855 and 1861 and would later exchange the estate with William Napier for his Tyersall estate. The estate was subsequently sold to Temenggong Abu Bakar in the mid-1860s. He gave it to his second wife, a Danish woman Zubaidah binti Abdullah who was born Cecilia Catharina Lange, for her residence. Thus the estate and house was known as Bidadari and Istana Bidadari in reference to the beauty of the Temenggong's wife.

Soon after Abu Bakar was proclaimed the Sultan of Johor in 1885, Sultana Zubaidah moved to Johor. The palace itself was rented out to various parties until 1902 and later its demolition in 1915.

=== 1908–1996: Cemetery ===
In 1902, plans were made to develop a Christian Cemetery. The Municipal Government acquired the land in 1904 and Bidadari Cemetery was officially opened in 1908. Later on, the Muslim, Hindu and Buddhist burial sections were added. The cemetery continued to accept burials till 1972. In 1996, the government announced that the site of the Bidadari Cemetery had been earmarked for development.

=== 2013–present: Redevelopment into residential estate ===
In 2013, HDB announced plans for a housing estate at the site of the former Bidadari Cemetery. Residential developments are currently underway. Upper Aljunied Road has been realigned, and three new roads (Bidadari Park Drive, Alkaff Crescent, Woodleigh Link) have been constructed to serve the upcoming estate. The first flats in Bidadari were completed in 2019 and The Woodleigh mall, a mixed-use development, opened in May 2023. The integrated transport hub with the hawker centre was opened in April 2025. The interchange is located underneath Woodleigh Village BTO project, which also consists of a hawker centre. Together with Woodleigh MRT station and The Woodleigh Mall, it is part of the Woodleigh Integrated Transport Hub.

== Infrastructure and amenities ==
=== Public Transportation ===
==== Mass Rapid Transit (MRT) ====
There are two main MRT stations serving Bidadari, as part of the Circle Line and North East Line.

- CC12 Bartley
- NE11 Woodleigh

==== Bus ====
Woodleigh Bus Interchange is an underground bus interchange that serves Bidadari estate and was initially expected to be ready by 2021 but was delayed due to engineering challenges. It opened on 20 April 2025.

=== Shopping centres ===
Currently the only shopping mall in the estate is The Woodleigh Mall, opened in May 2023. It is directly connected to Woodleigh MRT station, the hawker centre and The Woodleigh Residences condominium.

=== Parks ===
Bidadari Park is an 10-hectare park located in the heart of the estate, opened in September 2024. Features of the park includes a lake, The Alkaff Lake and a heritage walk which replaces the former Upper Aljunied Road that has been expunged after the realignment. There is also an overhead bridge connecting to The Woodleigh Mall and Woodleigh station.

=== Schools ===
There are two primary and three secondary schools in the Bidadari area.

Primary schools

- Cedar Primary School
- Maris Stella High School (Primary Section)

Secondary schools

- Bartley Secondary School
- Cedar Girls Secondary School
- Maris Stella High School (Secondary Section)

There is only one international school in Bidadari.

- Stamford American International School (University Section)
