= Bidadari Cemetery =

Defunct cemetery in Toa Payoh, Singapore

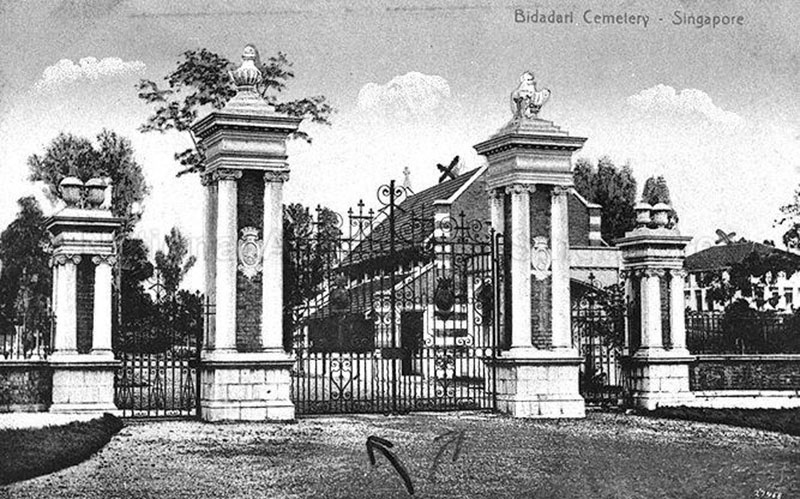
- Gates of Bidadari Cemetery in the 1930s
- Interactive map of Bidadari Cemetery

Details
- Established: 1 January 1908; 118 years ago
- Closed: 31 October 1972; 53 years ago
- Location: Bidadari, Toa Payoh
- Country: Singapore
- Coordinates: 1.34027°N 103.87809°E
- Type: Historic, Municipal
- Size: 26 hectares (260,000 m^{2})
- No. of graves: 147,000 (Approx.)

Bidadari Cemetery (Malay: Perkuburan Bidadari, lit. Cemetery of the Angels, Chinese: 比达达利坟场) is a defunct cemetery in Singapore. It used to serve the Christian, Muslim, Hindu and Sinhalese communities, and accepted burials between 1907 and 1972. The site of Bidadari Cemetery used to be Istana Bidadari, the home of Che Puan Besar Zubaidah, who was the second wife of Sultan Abu Bakar of Johor.

The cemetery accepted its last burial in 1972. By 2006, all known graves were exhumed to make way for development of the Bidadari Estate.

== Etymology ==
The name "Bidadari" comes from the Malay word for "angel". Prior to its use as a cemetery, it was formerly Istana Bidadari which was used by Che Puan Besar Zubaidah, who was the second wife of Sultan Abu Bakar as her residence.

== History ==
A 45-acre estate in Singapore was first acquired by the British civil engineer Henry Minchin Simons in 1855, there he had the residence built between 1855 and 1861 and later exchanged it with William Napier for his Tyersall estate.

The estate was subsequently sold to Temenggong Abu Bakar in the mid-1860s. He gave it to his second wife, a Danish woman Zubaidah binti Abdullah who was born Cecilia Catharina Lange, for her residence. Thus the estate and house was known as Bidadari and Istana Bidadari in reference to the beauty of the Temenggong's wife as compared to the fairies.

Soon after Abu Bakar was proclaimed the Sultan of Johor in 1885, Sultana Zubaidah moved to Johor.

=== Establishment ===
In 1902, the Municipal Commissioners officially declared the acquisition of 26 hectares of the property to be used as a cemetery, which would be named after the estate. The Bidadari Cemetery was officially opened on 1 January 1908.

There were several sections in the cemetery: The Christian section was across Upper Aljunied Road from the Muslim section, and was bounded by Upper Serangoon Road; the Muslim section (opened on 14 February 1910) was at the base of Mount Vernon, bounded by Upper Aljunied Road, Upper Serangoon Road, and Bartley Road; while the Hindu and Sinhalese sections were opened in 1929.

A 10-acre land near the east of the cemetery was acquired by Syed Shaik Abdul Rahman Alkaff of the prominent Singaporean-Arab Alkaff family. He built the Alkaff Gardens, which were styled as a Japanese landscaped garden with artificial lake and hills, Japanese arch, two Japanese wooden bridges and teahouses. It was opened to the public in 1930 and was the first Japanese garden in Singapore.

There were two chapels, one for Protestants and the other for Roman Catholics, designed by the architect David McLeod Craik, a celebrated architect of many buildings of historic importance in the Straits Settlements.

Bidadari Mosque was constructed in 1932, the cost mostly borne by Syed Abdulrahman Bin Shaikh Alkaff, who was a member of the Alkaff family, inside the cemetery However, it was demolished in 2007 after the exhumations of the graves ended.

The Bidadari Christian Cemetery accepted military burials from 1907 to 1941, including Christian soldiers killed during the 1915 Sepoy Mutiny. In 1957, the Christian soldiers buried there were reinterred at Ulu Pandan War Cemetery and later moved to Kranji War Cemetery. The cemetery was also one of the filming locations in Singapore for the 1967 film Pretty Polly.

The last burial at Bidadari Cemetery took place on 31 October 1972 and the cemetery was converted into a park. Apart from being a place of remembrance, the trails inside Bidadari Cemetery used to be very popular as a running route for members of the Gurkha Contingent.

=== Exhumation ===
The area was earmarked for development in the government's 1998 land-use masterplan. Between 2001 and 2006, all known graves, consisting of 58,000 Christian and 68,000 Muslim graves, were exhumed. The majority of the Christian graves were unclaimed. The remains of Muslims were reburied at the Pusara Abadi Cemetery in Choa Chu Kang, while unclaimed Christians' remains were cremated, and their ashes scattered at sea between 24 and 29 March 2008.

=== Memorial Garden ===
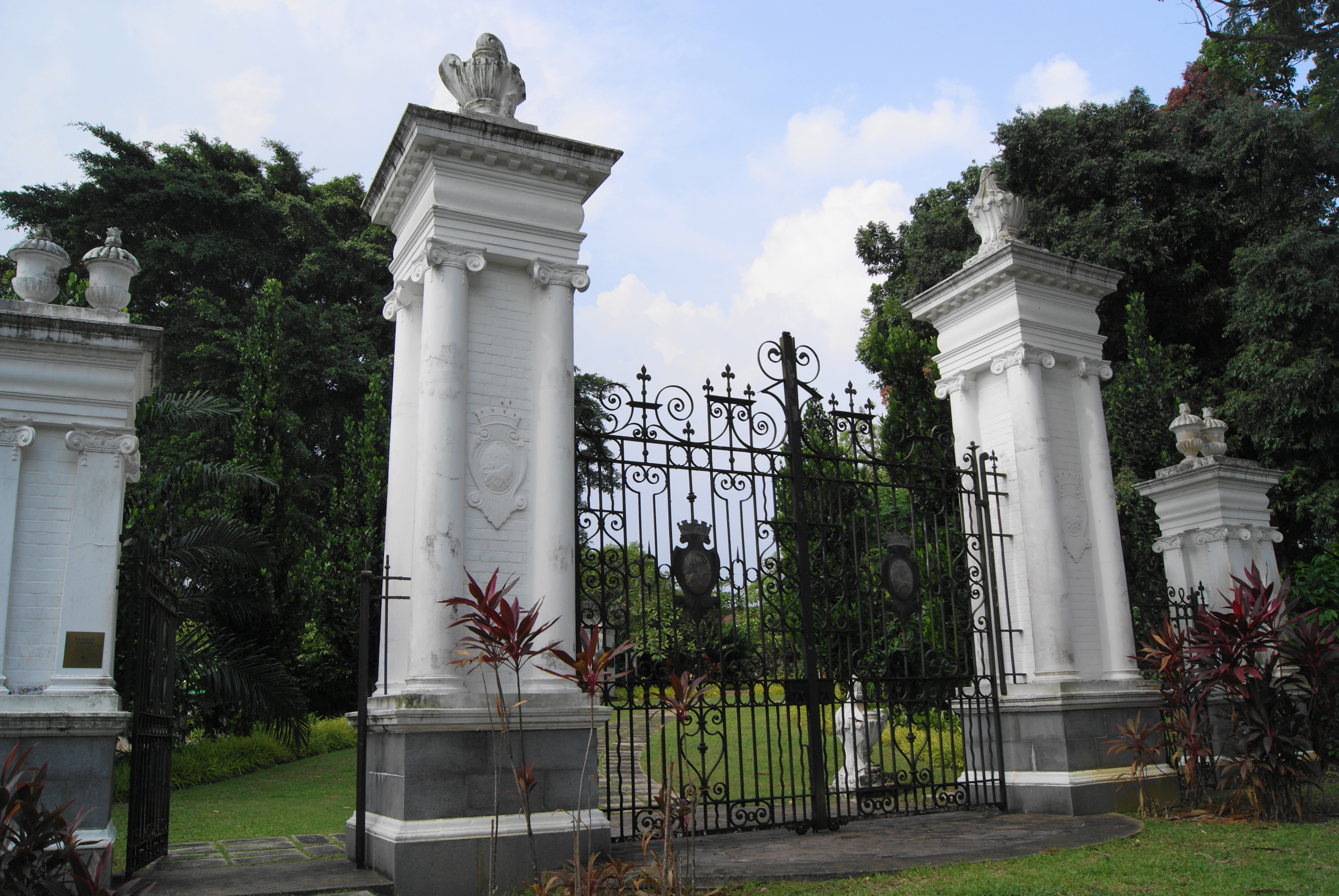
The gate of the former Bidadari Cemetery, currently located in Bidadari Memorial Garden at 10 Vernon Park, Singapore 367812.

Singaporeans were concerned that the history of Bidadari Cemetery was being erased and something should be done to commemorate the historical figures who were buried there. As a result, the National Heritage Board decided to relocate the cemetery gates and twenty tombstones of key historical figures, including Ahmad Ibrahim, Minister of Health of Singapore from 1959 until 1961 and the Minister of Labour until his death in 1962, to Bidadari Memorial Garden, which was created in 2004, at Mount Vernon.

== Developments ==
The Woodleigh MRT station which was constructed close to the western end of former Malay and Christian sections along the Upper Serangoon Road, was completed and operational in 2003 but remained closed due to low commuter traffic in the vicinity.

The Woodleigh MRT station was opened eight years later on 20 June 2011. In late 2011, the Ministry of National Development (MND), developed a blueprint for a new housing estate with HDB flats and private housing on several parts of the former cemetery. Works began in 2012, with the first batch of built-to-order HDB flats expected to be ready in 2018.

== Notable burials ==
Bidadari once had sections for Hindus, Muslims and Christians and many prominent people were buried here.

- Eunos Abdullah – Founder of Malay Settlement (Perkampungan Melayu) in Eunos, Geylang, Ubi, Bedok, Changi, Kallang, Tanah Merah and Founder of Kesatuan Melayu Singapura (Singapore Malay Union) and Founder of Utusan Melayu (first Malay newspaper in Malaya)
- Ahmad Ibrahim – Minister of Health and Minister of Labour
- Sunny Ang – Singaporean law student and convicted murderer, who was executed in 1967
- Regent Alfred John Bidwell – British architect who designed the Raffles Hotel
- Emily Maude Buckeridge – Wife of Harry Nugent Buckeridge of 'Buckeridge's Studios' Singapore. Photographer and Artist.
- Douglas Campbell – British advisor in Johor
- Lim Boon Keng – physician, writer, intellectual, and social reformer
- Grace Yin – 2nd wife of Dr Lim Boon Keng
- Sir Ong Siang Song - lawyer, first ever Asian residing in Singapore to receive a knighthood
- Joan Giles – wife of Carl Giles
- John Laycock - lawyer and founding member of the Progressive Party
- Sir George Oehlers - Speaker of the Legislative Assembly
- Syarif Masahor – Sarawakian rebel
- Augustine Podmore Williams – English sailor, on whose life Joseph Conrad based his novel Lord Jim.
- Duncan George Stewart – Second Governor of Crown Colony of Sarawak
- L/Cpl Thomas (Big Tam) Darling – The Queen's Own Cameron Highlanders and LT Malaya Police
- Gertrude Bryde Hodge (1939) – founder of Malaysian Girl Guide movement
- Baharuddin Ariff – People's Action Party assemblyman from 1959 to 1961
- Osman bin Ali – perpetrator of the Leedon Park double murders
- Ahmad Nisfu - Malay Film Production actor in the 1950s and 60s
- Edwy Lyonet Talma – colonial administrator

== Gallery ==
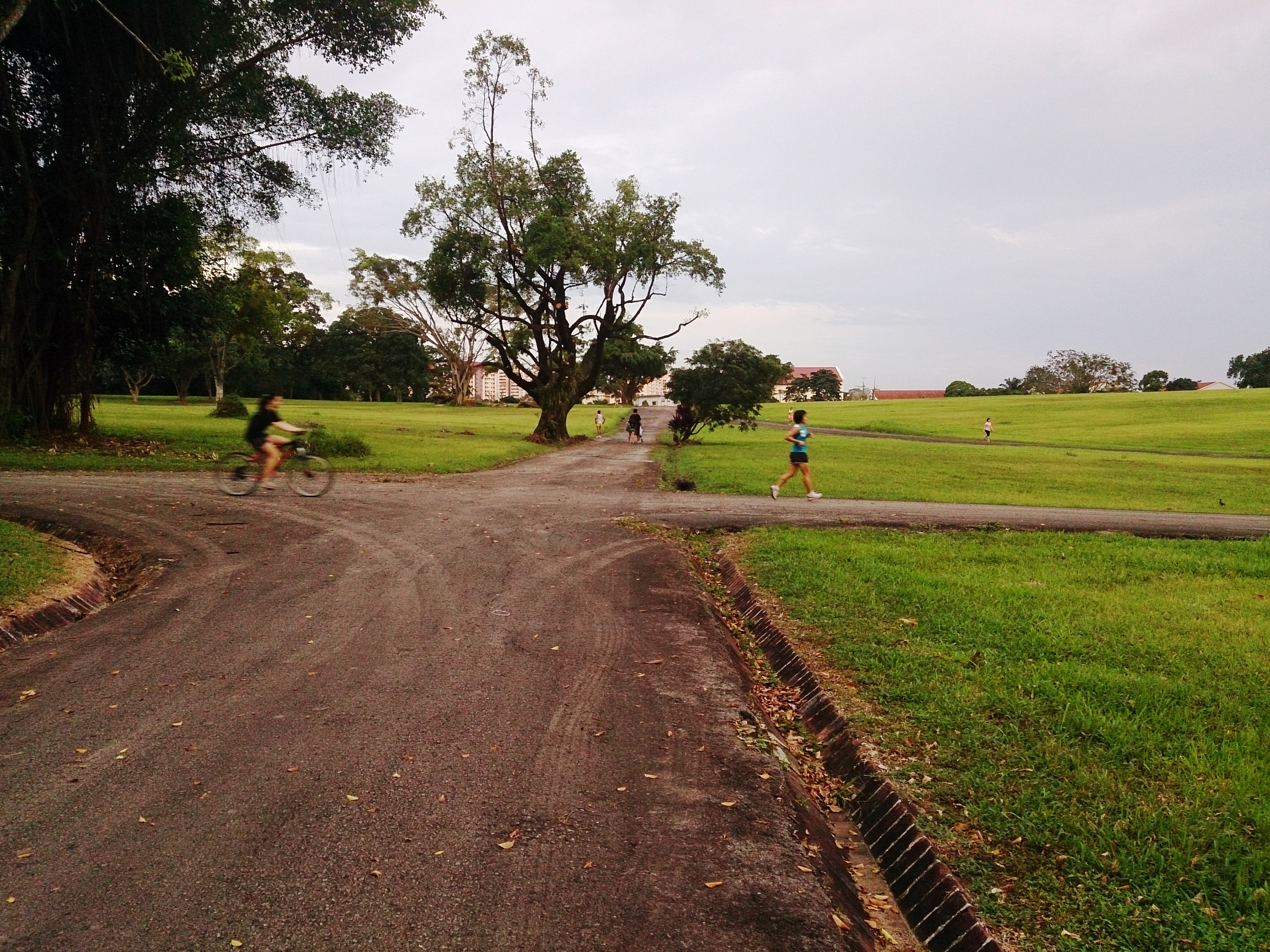
Post-exhumed fields of the former cemetery

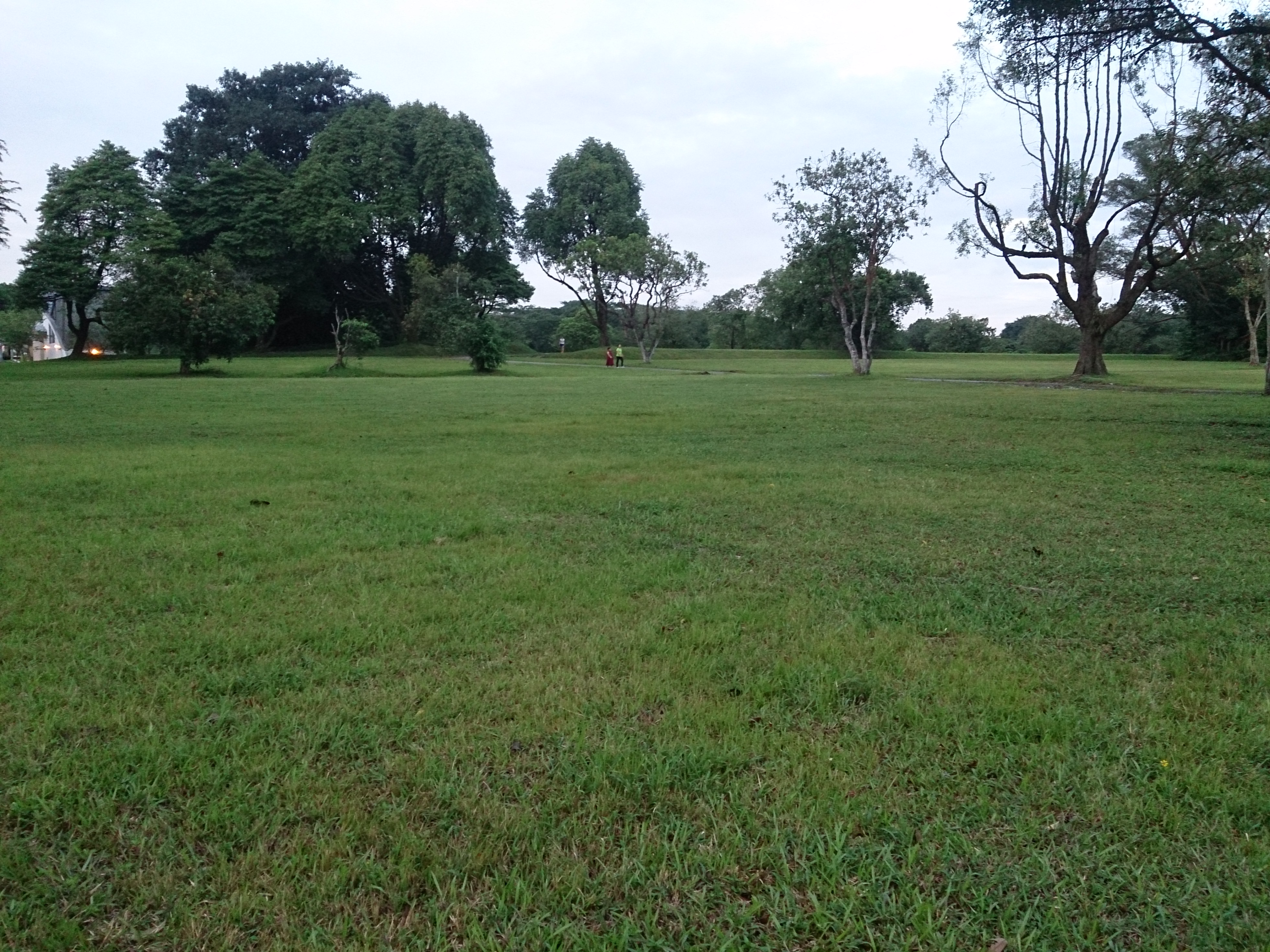

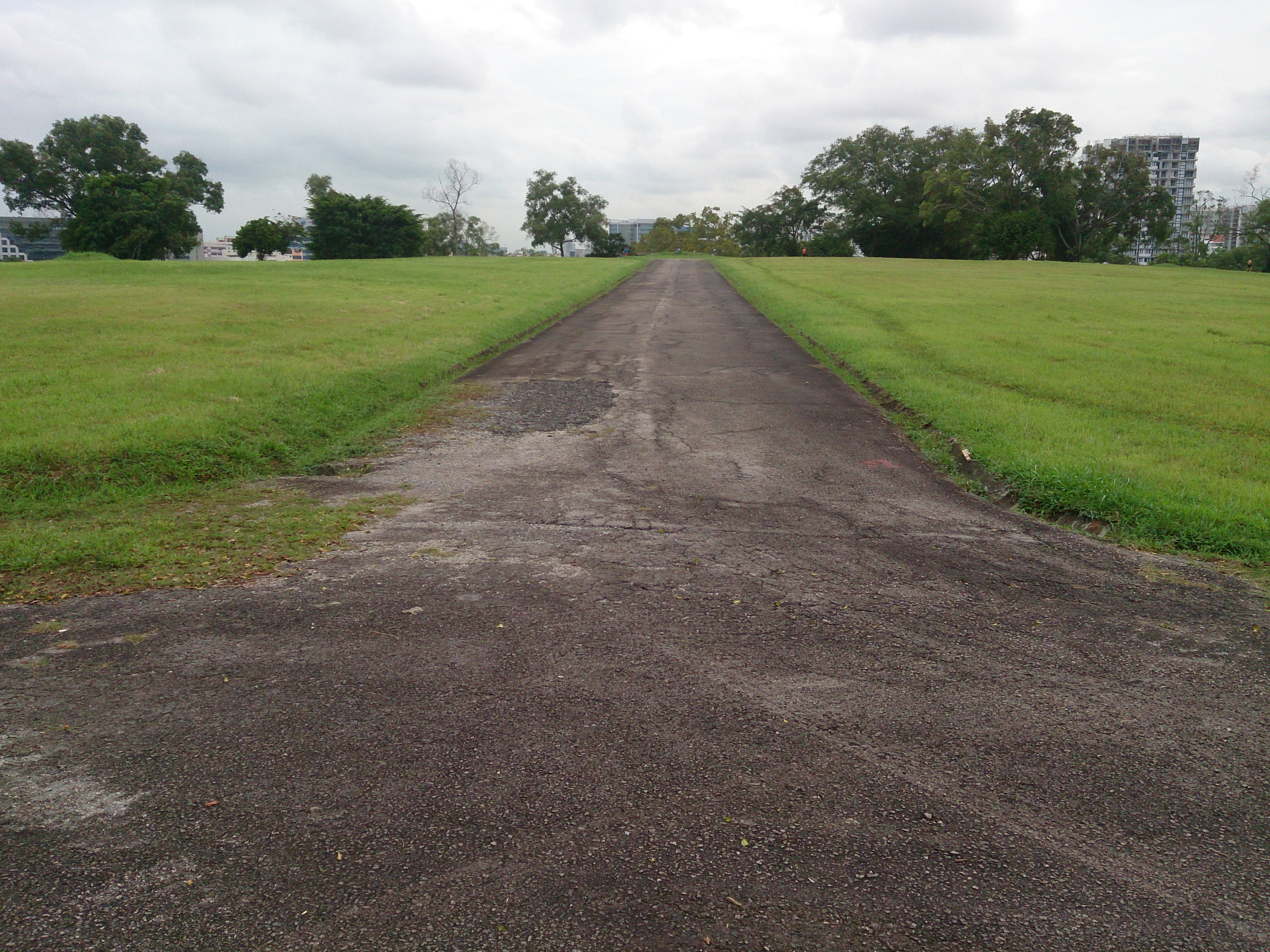

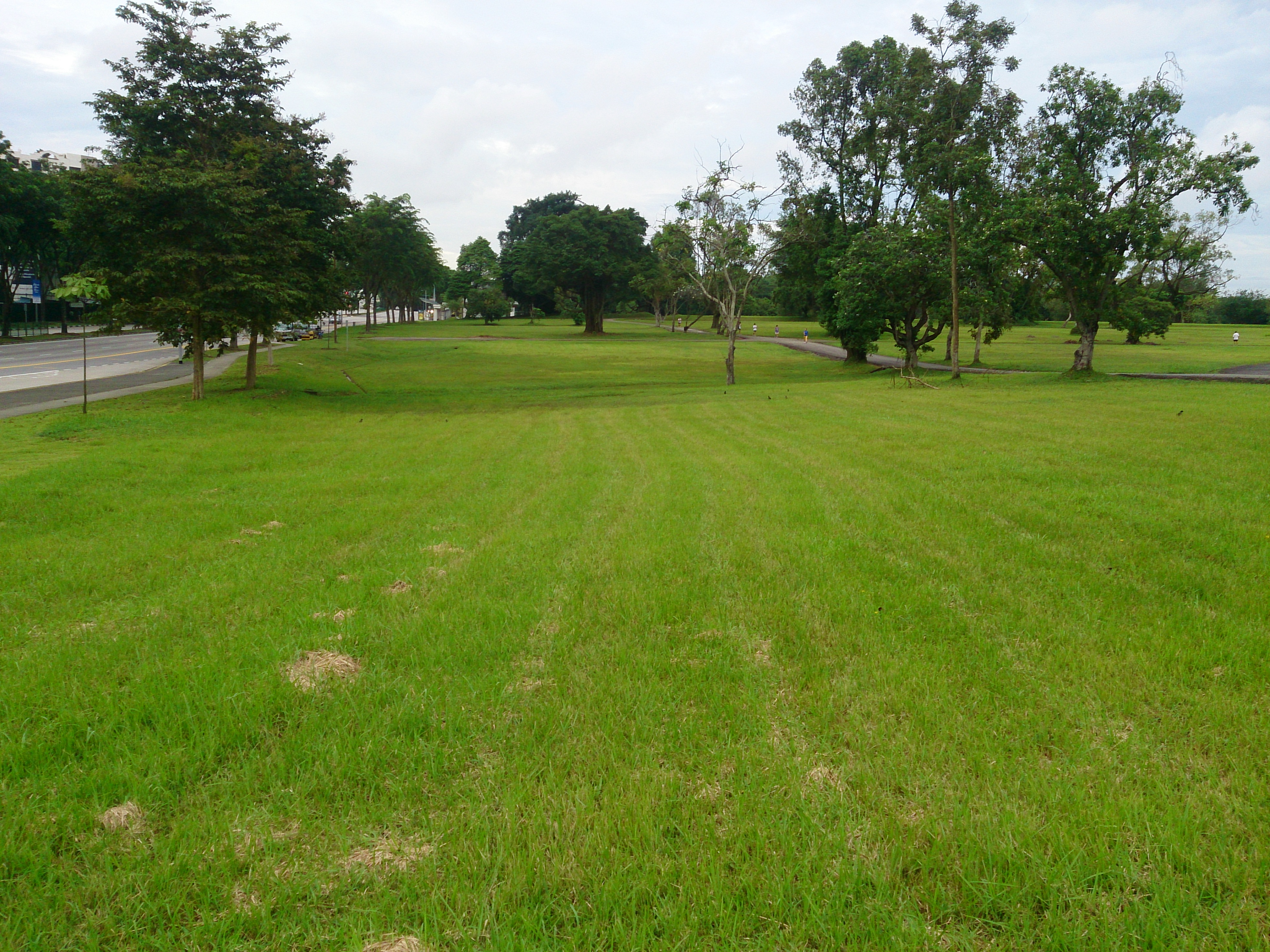

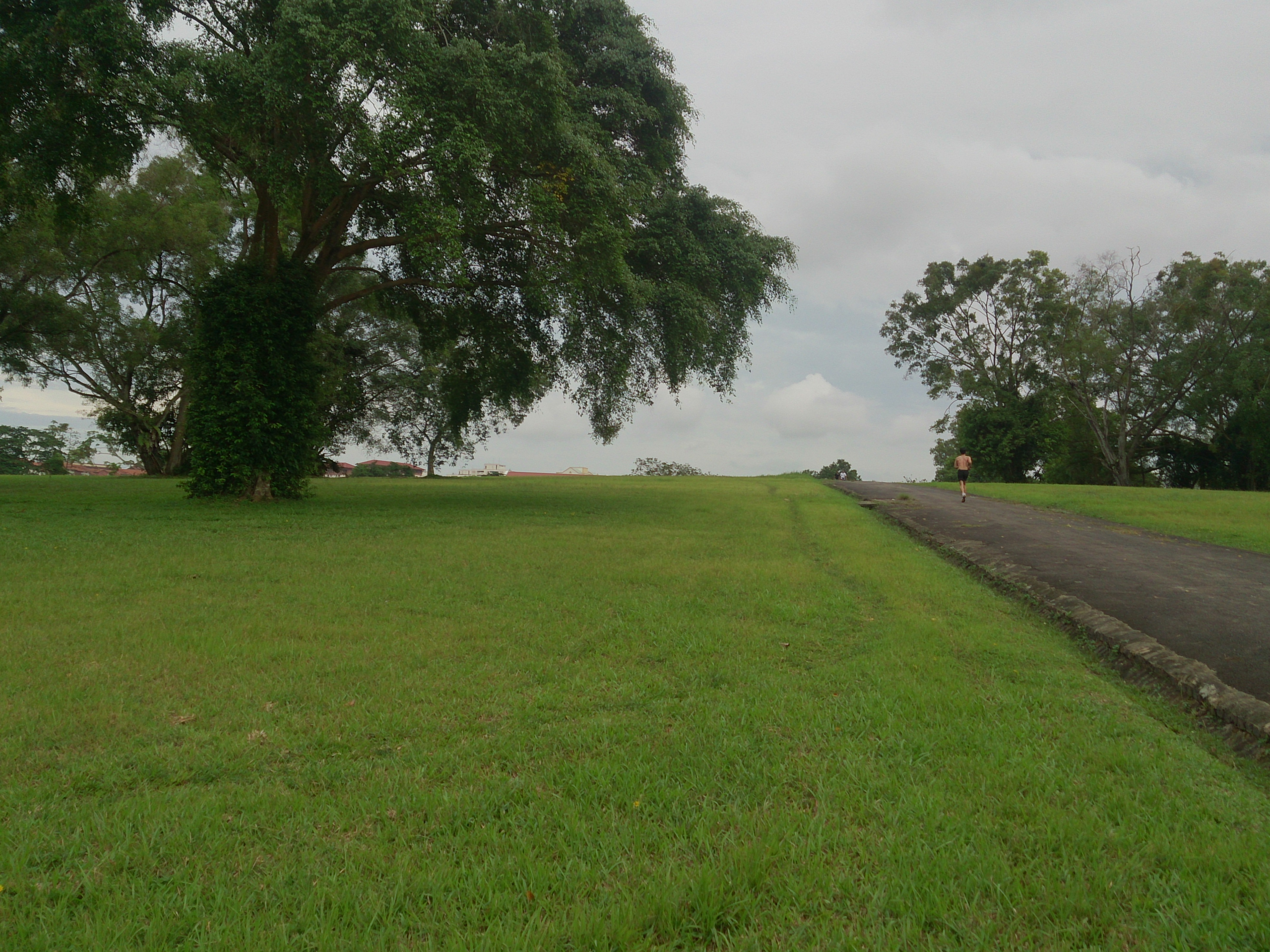

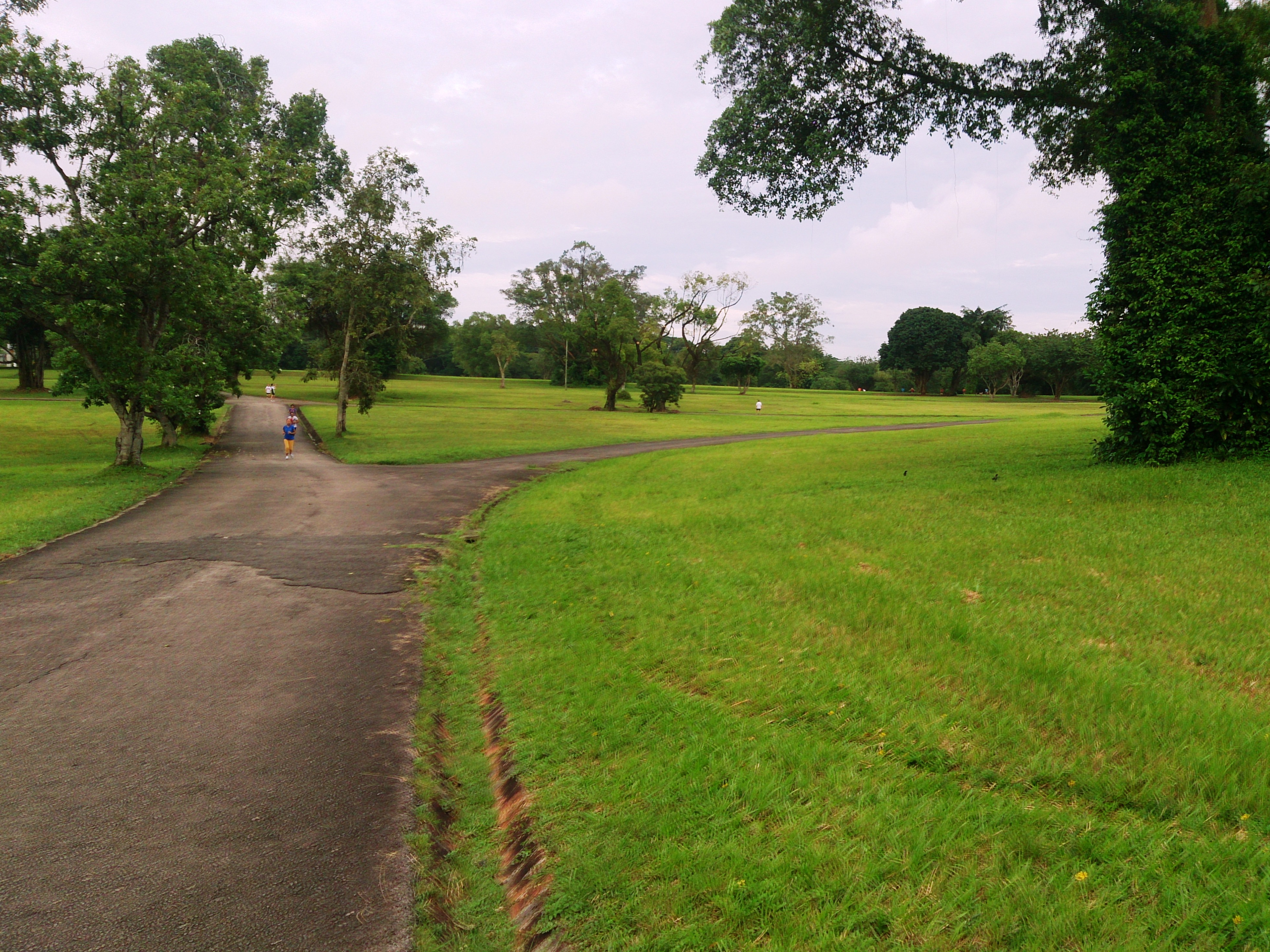

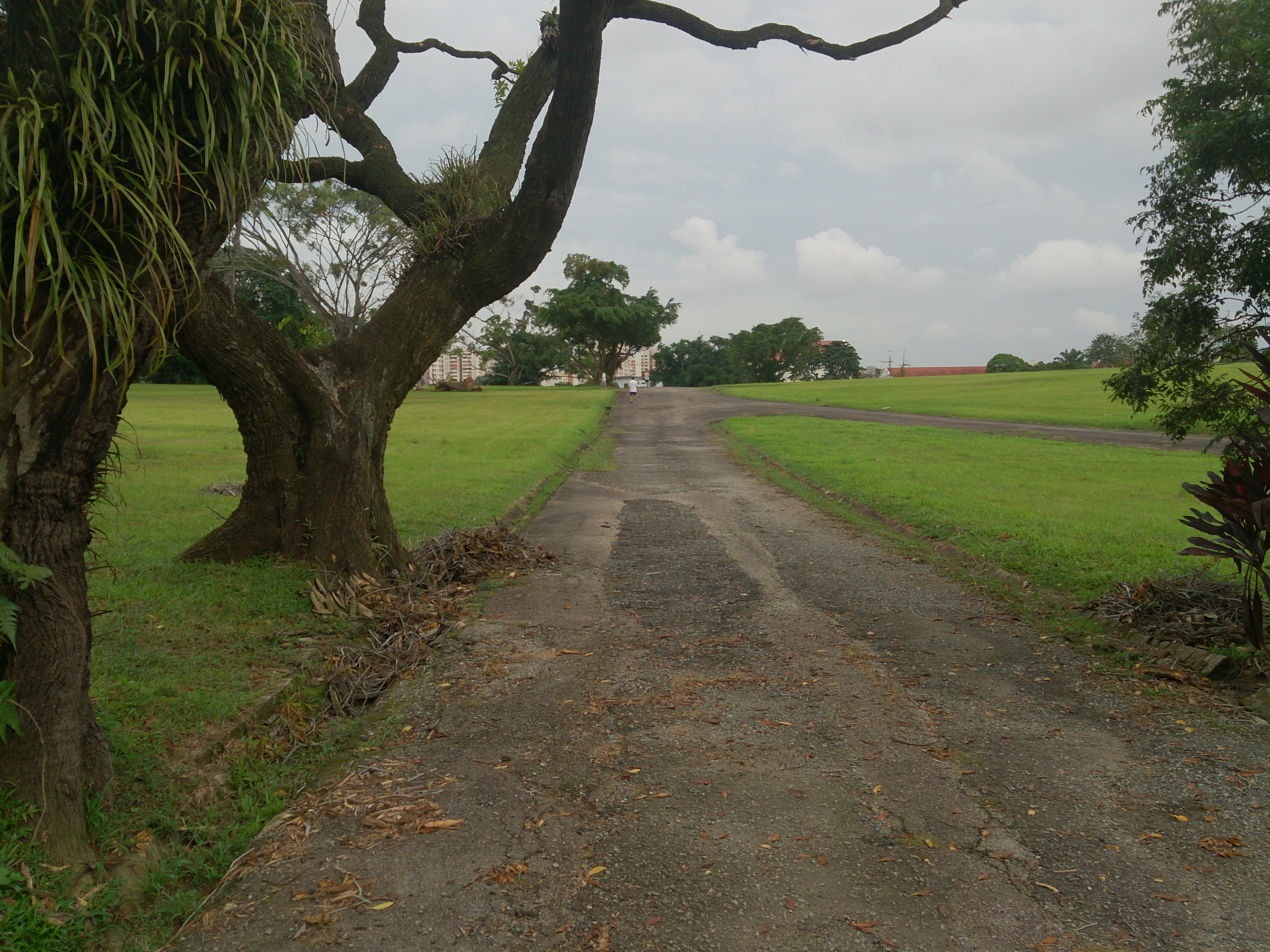

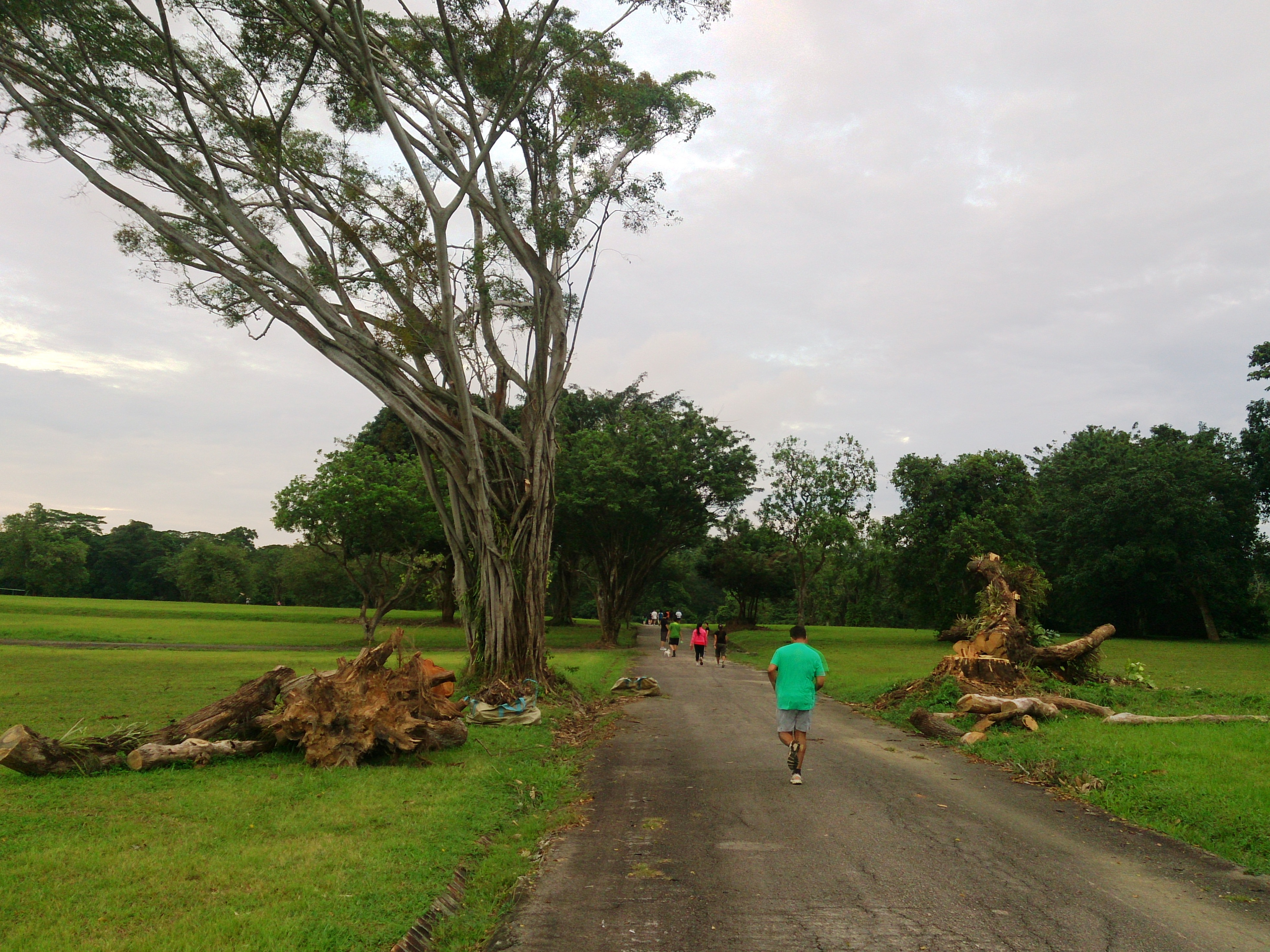

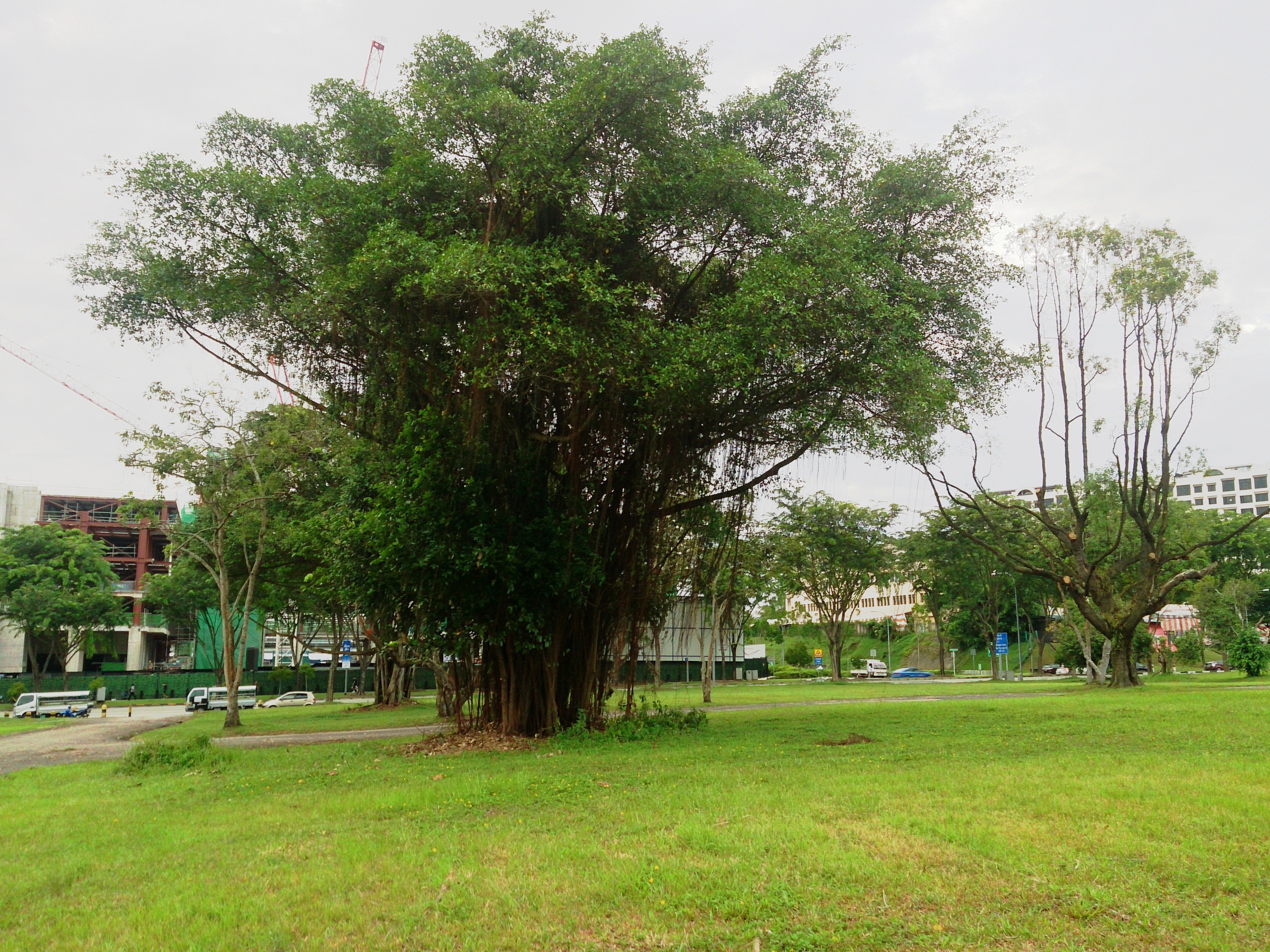
A banyan tree at the site of the former cemetery.

== See also ==
- British Association for Cemeteries in South Asia
- Former cemeteries in Singapore
- Alkaff Gardens

== Bibliography ==
- Victor R Savage, Brenda S A Yeoh (2004), Toponymics – A Study of Singapore Street Names, Eastern University Press, ISBN 981-210-364-3.
