= Lord Jim (1965 film) =

1965 film by Richard Brooks

- Original film poster by Bob Peak and Howard Terpning
- Directed by: Richard Brooks
- Screenplay by: Richard Brooks
- Based on: Lord Jim (1900 novel) by Joseph Conrad
- Produced by: Richard Brooks
- Starring: Peter O'Toole; James Mason; Curt Jürgens; Eli Wallach; Jack Hawkins; Paul Lukas; Akim Tamiroff; Daliah Lavi
- Cinematography: Freddie Young
- Edited by: Alan Osbiston
- Music by: Bronisław Kaper
- Production companies: Keep Films; Columbia Pictures
- Distributed by: Columbia Pictures
- Release dates: 15 February 1965 (Royal Film Performance); 16 February 1965 (UK); 25 February 1965 (US)
- Running time: 154 minutes
- Country: United Kingdom; United States
- Language: English
- Box office: $5,000,000 (US/ Canada rentals)

Lord Jim is a 1965 adventure film written, directed, and produced by Richard Brooks. It is the second film adaptation of the 1900 novel by Joseph Conrad, following a 1925 silent film. The film stars Peter O'Toole, James Mason, Curt Jürgens, Eli Wallach, Jack Hawkins, Paul Lukas, Akim Tamiroff, Juzo Itami and Daliah Lavi.

The film premiered with a Royal Film Performance on February 15, 1965. Distributed by Columbia Pictures, Lord Jim received a lukewarm critical response and was a commercial disappointment. Nonetheless, it received two BAFTA Award nominations, for Best Art Direction and Best Cinematography.

== Plot ==
In 1899, Jim is a promising young English merchant seaman who rises to first officer under Captain Charles Marlow. Jim is injured and left at Java. When he is fit again, he signs on with the first available ship, a dilapidated freighter called the SS Patna, crammed with hundreds of Muslims on a pilgrimage to Mecca. When a storm threatens the leaking ship, the crew panics and takes to the lifeboats, deserting their passengers; in a moment of weakness, Jim joins them. When they reach port, the sailors are stunned to find Patna already there. The rest of the crew disappears, but Jim insists on confessing his guilt at an official inquiry and is stripped of his sailing papers. Filled with self-loathing, Jim becomes a drifter.

One day, Jim saves a boatload of gunpowder from sabotage. Stein, the cargo's owner, offers him an extremely dangerous job: transporting it and some rifles by river to distant Patusan to help Stein's old friend, the town's chief Du-Ramin, lead an uprising against bandits led by a local warlord named The General. When saloon keeper Schomberg is bribed to deny Stein the use of the motorboat he had promised, Jim takes a sailboat with two native crewmen, leaving the aged Stein behind. As they near their destination, one of the crewmen reveals himself to be working for the General. He kills the other sailor and flees to warn the General. Jim manages to hide the cargo before he is captured.

Jim is tortured but refuses to divulge the location. This surprises Cornelius, the drunken, cowardly agent of Stein's trading company who has joined the general. That night, Jewel, a native girl, leads Jim's rescue. Jim distributes the arms and plans the attack on the General's stockade. He is assisted by Dain Waris, Du-Ramin's son. After much bloody fighting, Jim delivers the crushing blow, pushing a barrel of gunpowder through a hail of bullets into the bandits' final stronghold, blowing it up along with the General. Only Cornelius survives, hiding in a secret underground room with the General's hidden treasure. Jim is hailed as a hero. Du-Ramin bestows the title tuan on him, which translates as "Lord".

Jim is content to live in Patusan with Jewel. Cornelius and Schomberg recruit notorious cut-throat "Gentleman" Duncan Brown and his men to steal the treasure, and in the course of this they are detected and cornered. At an impasse, Brown offers to leave peacefully, but the village does not trust him. Jim insists they be allowed to go, offering his own life as forfeit if anyone is killed as a result. As Brown and his men feign to leave, under cover of heavy fog, they make one last attempt at the treasure. Waris and Jim dispatch them, although Waris is mortally wounded. Stein pleads with Du-Ramin to spare Jim. Du-Ramin agrees if Jim leaves the following morning. Stein urges Jim to leave but he refuses. The following morning as the funeral procession for the dead villagers starts, Jim walks up to Du-Ramin and waits, taking in the village's beauty. Du-Ramin shoots him and Jim's body is added to the procession, which ends in the cremation of the dead.

== Cast ==
- Peter O'Toole as Lord Jim
- James Mason as "Gentleman" Duncan Brown
- Curt Jürgens as Cornelius
- Eli Wallach as The General
- Jack Hawkins as Captain Charles Marlow
- Paul Lukas as Stein
- Daliah Lavi as Jewel
- Akim Tamiroff as Schomberg
- Jūzō Itami as Dain Waris
- Tatsuo Saitō as Du-Ramin
  - Paul Frees as Du-Ramin's voice (uncredited)
- Andrew Keir as Brierly
- Jack MacGowran as Robinson
- Eric Young as Malay
- Noel Purcell as Captain Chester
- Walter Gotell as Patna Captain
- Marne Maitland as Elder
- A. J. Brown as Magistrate
- Christian Marquand as French Officer
- Ric Young as Malay
- Rafiq Anwar as Muslim Leader
- John Richardson as Sailor (uncredited)

== Production ==
Richard Brooks optioned the Joseph Conrad novel Lord Jim in 1957. He originally sought Albert Finney as Jim, Toshiro Mifune as The General, and Laurence Olivier as Gentleman Brown. The latter declined because he didn't want to travel to Cambodia for several weeks.

The film was made at Shepperton Studios, England, and on location in Angkor Wat, Cambodia; Hong Kong; and Malacca, Malaysia. It was photographed in Super Panavision 70 by Freddie Young. In a 1971 interview, Peter O'Toole spoke of some of the difficulties of location filming:

The three months we spent in Cambodia were dreadful. Sheer hell. A nightmare. There we were, all of us, knee deep in lizards and all kinds of horrible insects. And everyone hating us. Awful.

The crew and cast of the film were joined by Cambodian translator Dith Pran, who was a liaison between Cambodians and the film-makers and cast. Later, he left the country after the 1975 Communist takeover and his imprisonment, which were told in the 1984 film The Killing Fields with Haing S. Ngor as Pran. Denise Affonço claimed that her husband Phou Teang Seng worked on the film as a production manager.

=== Music ===
The music score by Bronisław Kaper featured the use of Gamelan musicians.

== Release ==
The film had its world premiere on 15 February 1965 at the Odeon Leicester Square in the West End of London as the Royal Film Performance in the presence of Queen Elizabeth, the Queen Mother; Princess Margaret, Countess of Snowdon; and Antony Armstrong-Jones, 1st Earl of Snowdon.

== Reception ==
The film opened to lukewarm reviews and to minimal box-office returns. Bosley Crowther of The New York Times called Lord Jim a "big, gaudy, clanging color film" that "misses at being either Conrad or sheer entertainment cinema." Neither was he satisfied with O'Toole's performance, characterizing it as "so sullen, soggy, and uncertain, especially toward the end, that it is difficult to find an area of recognizable sensitivity in which one can make contact with him." Variety was equally critical, stating "Brooks has teetered between making it a full-blooded, no-holds-barred adventure yarn and the fascinating psychological study that Conrad wrote." O'Toole's performance was described as "self-indulgent and lacking in real depth."

Cambodian Head of State and former King Norodom Sihanouk did not like the film's portrayal of Cambodia. Thus, by 1966 he countered it by making the film Apsara, which was his first feature-length and color film.

The film holds a 57% rating on Rotten Tomatoes based on reviews from 14 critics. The score was nominated for the American Film Institute's 2005 list AFI's 100 Years of Film Scores.

=== Awards and nominations ===
Ceremony	Category	Nominee	Result	Ref.
19th British Academy Film Awards	Best Cinematography - Colour	Freddie Young	Nominated	
19th British Academy Film Awards	Best British Art Direction - Colour	Geoffrey Drake	Nominated	

== Preservation ==
Lord Jim was preserved by the Academy Film Archive in 2000.

== Comic book adaption ==
- Gold Key: Lord Jim (September 1965)
- Issue #98 of Mad magazine (October 1965) parodied the film as Lord Jump.
