= Ernie Reyes =

Ernie Reyes may refer to:

- Ernie Reyes Jr. (born 1972), American actor and martial artist
- Ernie Reyes Sr., American martial artist, actor and fight choreographer
