= American Repertory Company =

Repertory company (1980s–2004)

- Director: Manu Tupou
- Location: Los Angeles, California, U.S.

The American Repertory Company was a repertory company from the 1980s until 2004. It was founded by Manu Tupou who also was the artistic director until his death in 2004.

== History ==
The American Repertory Company was founded by Manu Tupou who was the artistic director. It was a private company which offered classes limited to no more than 12 or 15 students at the very maximum at a time as well as private training. This allowed Tupou to give focus on his students in detail and find their working problem and remedy it. Although Tupou brought with him the teachings of his teachers, he sought to revamp these techniques while retaining their strength and intensity in order to protect the actors' sanity. The new technique was called the New Era Acting Technique (NEAT).

== Technique and training ==
Manu Tupou formulated his discoveries into the simplistic, but revolutionary, "New Era Acting Technique" (NEAT). The hallmark of the NEAT technique is its respect for the sanctity and sanity of the individual artist.

== Notable alumni ==
- Eric Roberts (The Dark Knight, L.A. Confidential)
- Ernie Reyes Jr. (Red Canvas, Alice in Wonderland)
- Corin Nemec (Parker Lewis Can't Lose, Chicago Massacre: Richard Speck)
- Calvin Levels (Hellbound, Johnny Suede)
- Jerri Manthey (The Limited, Komodo vs Kobra)
- Ken Lee (Sudden Impact)
- Santino Ramos (Mind Polish: Master Hubbard's Special Reserve)
- Selwyn Ward (One Simple Promise, Power Rangers)
- Arash Dibazar (Ultimate Fight)
