= Santino Ramos =

American artist and martial artist

- Ramos at San Diego Comic-Con
- Born: Salinas, California, U.S.
- Occupations: Artist and martial artist
- Parent: Ernie Reyes Sr.
- Relatives: Ernie Reyes Jr. (brother)
- Website: youtube.com/santinoramos

Santino Ramos is an American artist and martial artist born in California.

== Martial artist ==
Ramos trained and competed in martial arts in San Jose, California. He began his martial arts training at Ernie Reyes West Coast Tae Kwon Do, which today the organization is Ernie Reyes West Coast World Martial Arts association. Today he continues his journey studying other styles.

== Artist ==
As an artist, Ramos's work has been published in Heavy Metal Magazine.

== Actor ==
Ramos studied acting, writing, and directing for several years at the American Repertory Company with Manu Tupou He had supporting roles in films such as Carrion and Ironhorse with Eric Lutes. He also utilizes his martial arts in front of the camera as an action actor, as well as in projects like Wiz Khalifa's Rolling Papers 2 music video.

== Filmography ==
(As an actor/action actor)

- Payday
- Ironhorse(2010)
- Mind Polish Master Hubbard's Special Reserve(2008)
- Polyphony (2008)
- Chicago Dracula (2007)
- Grandma's Boy (2006)
- Carrion(2006)
- Human Experimentz(2005)
- O.C.T.F.
- That's So Raven (2004)
- White Rush (2003)
- Malcolm in the Middle (2003)

== Filmmaker ==
Ramos' work as a filmmaker has made its way across the festival circuit. An animated segment by Ramos entitled "Rain or Shine" is featured on the children's show Polyphony. A green-themed children's show that was featured in the green cinema at the Coachella Valley Music and Arts Festival. Santino Ramos is also the director/producer of Mind Polish: Master Hubbard's Special Reserve, which is an experimental film that parodies Scientology. In 2012, Ramos designed the previs animation for "American President" an animated series by Paul Mooney. He was the post producer for the Agent 88 KickStarter video which was featured on CBS This Morning, MTV Geek, and LAtimes.com.
