= Henry VIII (play) =

Play by Shakespeare

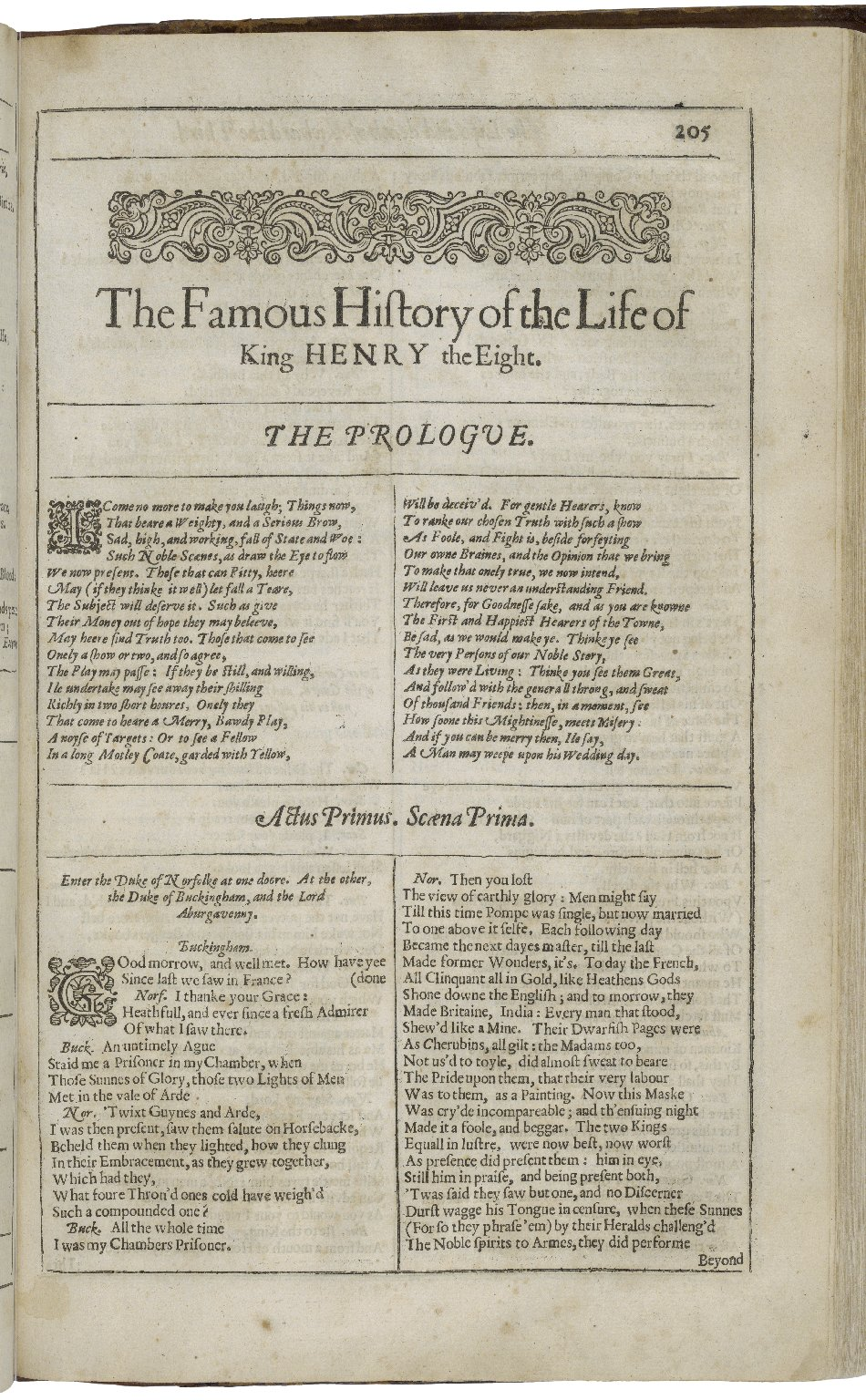
The first page of The Famous Hiſtory of the Life of King Henry Eight, printed in the Second Folio of 1632

The Famous History of the Life of King Henry the Eighth, often shortened to Henry VIII, is a collaborative history play, written by William Shakespeare and John Fletcher, based on the life of Henry VIII. An alternative title, All Is True, is recorded in contemporary documents, with the title Henry VIII not appearing until the play's publication in the First Folio of 1623. Stylistic evidence indicates that individual scenes were written by either Shakespeare or his collaborator and successor, John Fletcher. It is also somewhat characteristic of the late romances in its structure. It is noted for having more stage directions than any of Shakespeare's other plays.

During a performance of Henry VIII at the Globe Theatre in 1613, a cannon shot employed for special effects ignited the theatre's thatched roof and beams, burning the original Globe building to the ground.

== Characters ==
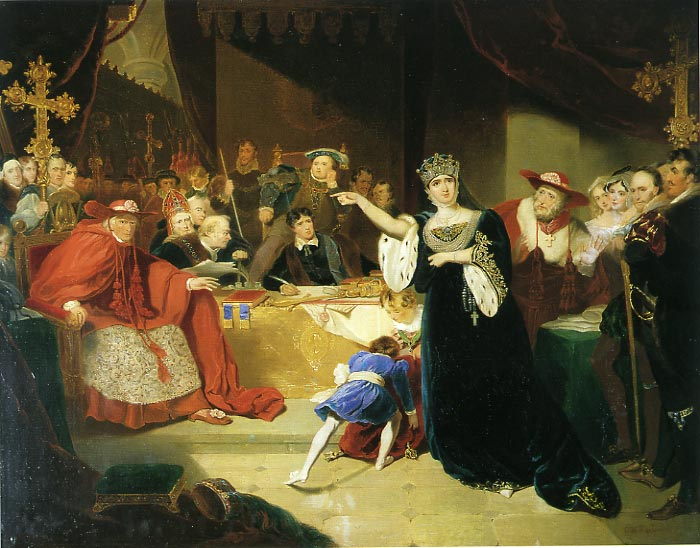
The Court for the Trial of Queen Katharine by George Henry Harlow, 1817

- Prologue/Epilogue
- Henry VIII – King of England
- Cardinal Wolsey – Archbishop of York and Lord Chancellor; initially, Henry's chief adviser
- Queen Katherine – later divorced
- Anne Bullen – Katherine's maid of honour; later Queen Anne (Note: This is the spelling in the First Folio. Shakespeare's principal source for his play was Holinshed's Chronicles, which used the contemporary spelling Bullen for the family surname. Shakespeare and his subsequent editors followed this precedent.)
- Duke of Buckingham – hates Wolsey, who charges him with treason
- Thomas Cranmer – Archbishop of Canterbury
- Stephen Gardiner – close ally of Wolsey; King's secretary; later Bishop of Winchester
- Lord Chamberlain – historically, the play covers a period in which the position was held by both Somerset and Lord Sands, but the play presents the character as one consistent figure
- Duke of Norfolk – Anne Bullen's grandfather; later Earl Marshal
- Duke of Suffolk – Henry's brother-in-law; later High Steward
- Earl of Surrey – Buckingham's son-in-law and Norfolk's son; also Lord Lieutenant of Ireland
- Cardinal Campeius – Papal legate sent to judge legitimacy of Henry's marriage to Katherine
- Lord Caputius – ambassador of Charles V, Holy Roman Emperor (Katherine's nephew) (Note: Holinshed referred to the ambassador Eustace Chapuys as "Eustachius Caputius", and accordingly this was the name used in Henry VIII.)
- Sir Thomas Cromwell – Wolsey's secretary and protégé; later secretary to the Privy Council
- Lord Sands – historically, was Lord Chamberlain during some of the period covered by the play
- Lord Abergavenny – Buckingham's son-in-law
- Lord Chancellor (Thomas More) – More replaces Wolsey, after which time he is never mentioned by name. Thomas Audley, 1st Baron Audley of Walden replaced More.
- Bishop of Lincoln
- Sir Thomas Lovell – Chancellor of the Exchequer
- Sir Henry Guildford – Master of the Horse
- Sir Nicholas Vaux – Governor of Guînes
- Sir Anthony Denny – Groom of the Stool
- Dr. Butts – Henry's personal physician
- Griffith – Katherine's usher
- Garter King-of-Arms
- Buckingham's Surveyor – based on Charles Knyvett
- Brandon – an officer (Note: Historically, Brandon's actions were carried out by Henry Marney, but Shakespearean editor Francis A. Marshall points out that an associate of Marney, also holding a judicial role, was Sir Thomas Brandon of the Privy Council.)
- Serjeant-at-Arms
- Porter
- Old Lady – Bullen's chaperone
- Patience – Katherine's waiting woman
- Doorkeeper of the Council Chamber
- First Secretary – works for Wolsey
- Second Secretary – works for Wolsey
- First Scribe – at Katherine's trial
- Second Scribe – at Katherine's trial
- Crier
- Gardiner's Page
- Three Gentlemen
- Lord Chamberlain's Servant
- Porter's Man
- Messenger

At the Legatine Court

- Archbishop of Canterbury – predecessor of Thomas Cranmer (non-speaking role)
- Bishop of Ely (non-speaking role)
- Bishop of Rochester (non-speaking role)
- Bishop of Saint Asaph (non-speaking role)

At Bullen's coronation

- Marquis Dorset (non-speaking role)
- Bishop of London (non-speaking role)
- Lord Mayor of London – historically Sir Stephen Peacock (non-speaking role)

At Elizabeth's christening

- Infant Princess Elizabeth (non-speaking role)
- Marchioness Dorset – Elizabeth's godmother (non-speaking role)
- Duchess of Norfolk – Elizabeth's godmother (non-speaking role)

== Synopsis ==
The play opens with a Prologue (by a figure otherwise unidentified), who stresses that the audience will see a serious play, and appeals to the audience members: "The first and happiest hearers of the town," to "Be sad, as we would make ye."

Act I opens with a conversation between the Dukes of Norfolk and Buckingham and Lord Abergavenny. Their speeches express their mutual resentment over the ruthless power and overweening pride of Cardinal Wolsey. Wolsey passes over the stage with his attendants, and expresses his own hostility toward Buckingham. Later Buckingham is arrested on treason charges—Wolsey's doing.

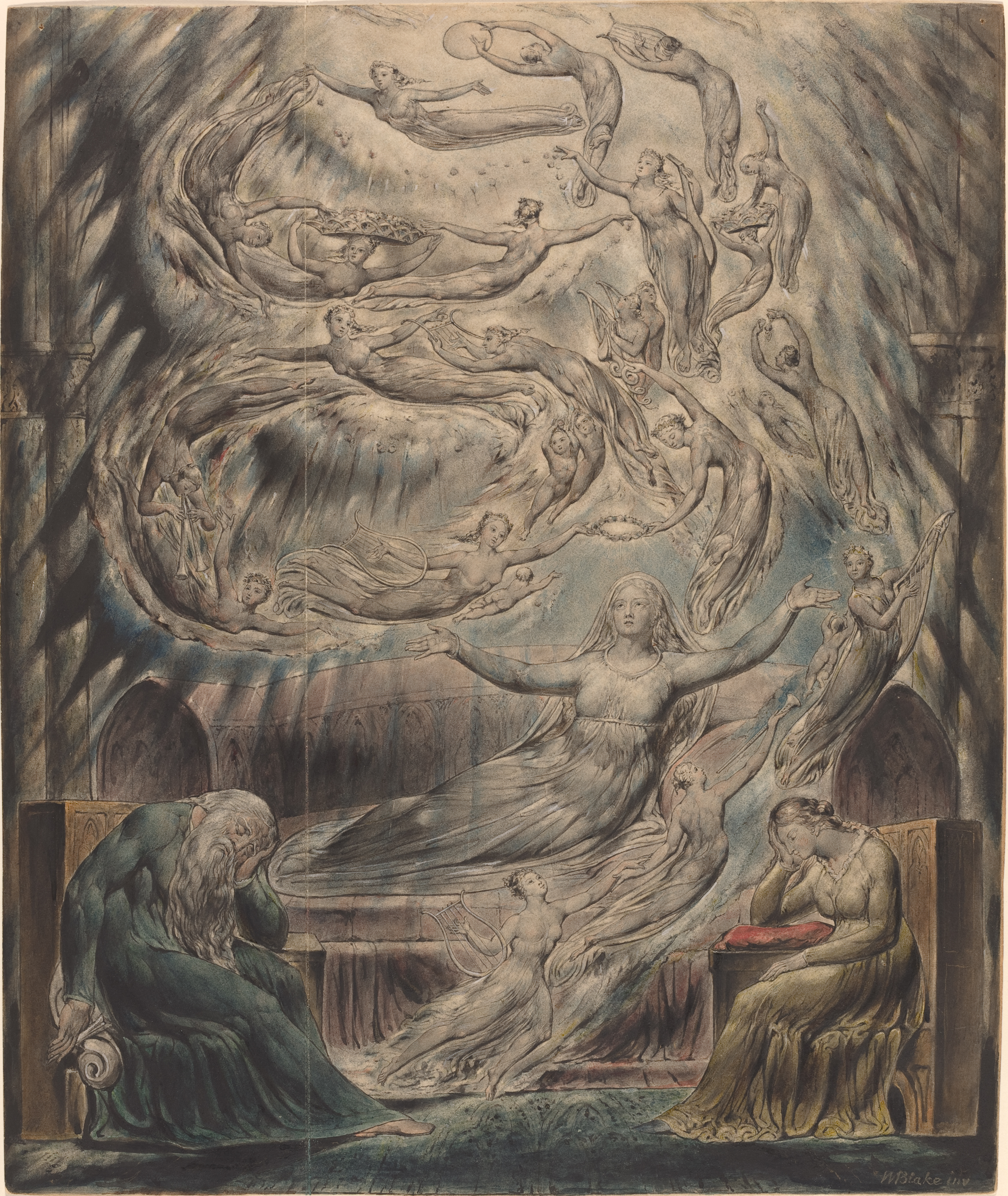
Queen Katherine's Dream by William Blake, c. 1825. NGA 11638, National Gallery of Art, Washington D.C.

The play's second scene introduces King Henry VIII, and shows his reliance on Wolsey as his favourite. Queen Katherine enters to protest about Wolsey's abuse of the tax system for his own purposes; Wolsey defends himself, but when the King revokes the Cardinal's measures, Wolsey spreads a rumour that he himself is responsible for the King's action. Katherine also challenges the arrest of Buckingham, but Wolsey defends the arrest by producing the Duke's Surveyor, the primary accuser. After hearing the Surveyor, the King orders Buckingham's trial to occur.

At a banquet thrown by Wolsey, the King and his attendants enter in disguise as masquers. The King dances with Anne Bullen.

Two anonymous Gentlemen open Act II, one giving the other an account of Buckingham's treason trial. Buckingham himself enters in custody after his conviction, and makes his farewells to his followers and to the public. After his exit, the two Gentlemen talk about court gossip, especially Wolsey's hostility toward Katherine. The next scene shows Wolsey beginning to move against the Queen, while the nobles Norfolk and Suffolk look on critically. Wolsey introduces Cardinal Campeius and Gardiner to the King; Campeius has come to serve as a judge in the trial Wolsey is arranging for Katherine.

Anne Bullen is shown conversing with the Old Lady who is her attendant. Anne expresses her sympathy at the Queen's troubles; but then the Lord Chamberlain enters to inform her that the King has made her Marchioness of Pembroke. Once the Lord Chamberlain leaves, the Old Lady jokes about Anne's sudden advancement in the King's favour.

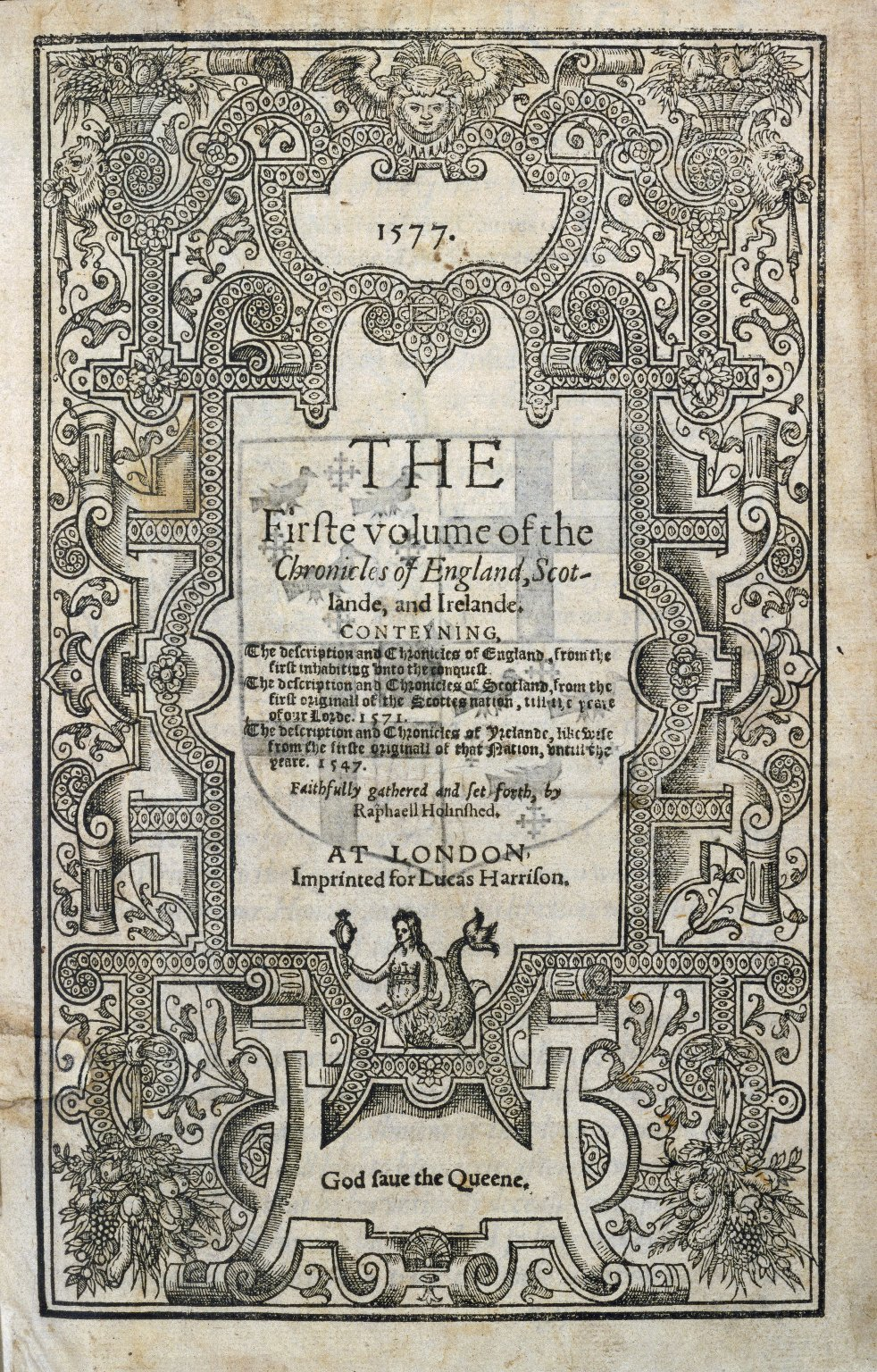
The first edition of Raphael Holinshed's Chronicles of England, Scotlande, and Irelande, printed in 1577.

A lavishly staged trial scene (Act II Scene 4) portrays Katherine's hearing before the King and his courtiers. Katherine reproaches Wolsey for his machinations against her, and refuses to stay for the proceedings. But the King defends Wolsey, and states that it was his own doubts about the legitimacy of their marriage that led to the trial. Campeius protests that the hearing cannot continue in the Queen's absence, and the King grudgingly adjourns the proceeding. (Act III) Wolsey and Campeius confront Katherine among her ladies-in-waiting; Katherine makes an emotional protest about her treatment.

Norfolk, Suffolk, Surrey, and the Lord Chamberlain are shown (Act III Scene 2) plotting against Wolsey. A packet of Wolsey's letters to the Pope have been re-directed to the King; the letters show that Wolsey is playing a double game, opposing Henry's planned divorce from Katherine to the Pope while supporting it to the King. The King shows Wolsey his displeasure, and Wolsey for the first time realises that he has lost Henry's favour. The noblemen mock Wolsey, and the Cardinal sends his follower Cromwell away so that Cromwell will not be brought down in Wolsey's fall from grace.

The two Gentlemen return in Act IV to observe and comment upon the lavish procession for Anne Bullen's coronation as Queen, which passes over the stage in their presence. Afterward they are joined by a third Gentleman, who updates them on more court gossip – the rise of Thomas Cromwell in royal favour, and plots against Cranmer, the Archbishop of Canterbury. (Scene 2) Katherine is shown ill; is told of Wolsey's death; has a vision of dancing spirits. Caputius visits her. Katherine expresses her continuing loyalty to the King, despite the divorce, and wishes the new queen well.

Act V is the climax of the play. The King summons a nervous Cranmer to his presence and expresses his friendship, telling Cranmer that "Thy truth and thy integrity is rooted in us, thy friend" (Act V Scene 1). The King confirms this friendship with the gift of a ring. Later, as a result of a carefully hatched plot, Cranmer is accused of heresy in the King's Council and told that he is to be taken to the Tower as a prisoner; Cranmer defends himself vigorously and then shows the King's ring (Act V Scene 2). The King enters, declaring Cranmer to be a "good man", a title that few of the Council deserve. The plot has collapsed.

Queen Anne Bullen gives birth to a daughter, the future Queen Elizabeth. The King asks Cranmer to baptise and be a godfather to the child, "a suit you must not deny me". The Chamberlain, the Porter and his Man have difficulties controlling the enthusiastic crowds that attend the infant Elizabeth's christening. Cranmer delivers a peroration on the glories of the new-born princess's future reign, "Upon this land, a thousand thousand blessings" (Act V Scene 4). The King responds, "O lord Archbishop, thou hast made me now a man," and declares the day to be a holiday.

The Epilogue acknowledges that the play is unlikely to please everyone, but asks nonetheless for the audience's approval.

== Sources ==
As usual in his history plays, Shakespeare relied primarily on Raphael Holinshed's Chronicles to achieve his dramatic ends and to accommodate official sensitivities over the materials involved. Other material was sourced or adapted from the 1570 edition of Foxe's Book of Martyrs, for example Catherine of Aragon's plea to Henry before the Legatine Court. Shakespeare not only telescoped events that occurred over a span of two decades, but jumbled their actual order. The play implies, without stating it directly, that the treason charges against the Duke of Buckingham were false and trumped up; and it maintains a comparable ambiguity about other sensitive issues. The disgrace and beheading of Anne Boleyn (here spelled Bullen) is carefully avoided, and no indication of the succeeding four wives of Henry VIII can be found in the play.

== Date ==
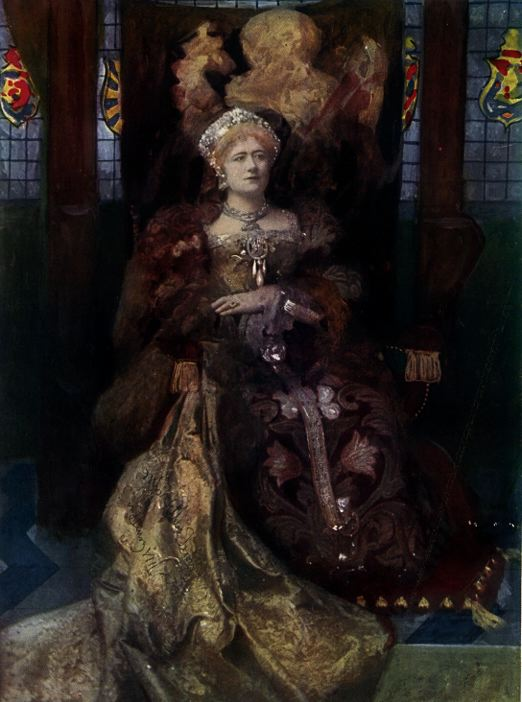
Dame Ellen Terry as Queen Katherine of Aragon

Most modern scholars date Henry VIII to 1613, the year in which the Globe Theatre burned down during one of the play's earliest known performances. One contemporary report states that the play was new at the time of the fire, having "been acted not passing 2 or 3 times before".

Despite this evidence, there has been much debate about the date of the work. Nicholas Rowe in 1709 wrote that the play must date from after the death of Elizabeth in 1603 because its "E[u]logy upon Q. Elizabeth, and her Successor K. James, in the latter end of his Henry VIII, is a Proof of that Play's being written after the Accession of the latter of those two Princes to the Crown of England". Rowe was writing before the discovery of the document on the 1613 fire, which was first published by the 18th century scholar Thomas Tyrwhitt and seemed to confirm his view.

However, several 18th- and 19th-century scholars, including Samuel Johnson, Lewis Theobald, George Steevens, Edmond Malone, and James Halliwell-Phillipps, dated the play's composition to before 1603. Malone suggested that the brief passage in praise of James was probably added for a performance during his reign but that the extended glorification of Elizabeth implies that it was intended for her ears. James "hated her memory", so such praise was not likely to have been written under him. Malone mistook the 12 Feb 1604 Stationer's Register entry of "the Enterlude of K. Henry VIII" (Samuel Rowley's When You See Me You Know Me, 1605) as Shakespeare's play, and he argued that the reference to the newness of the play in 1613 derived from the fact that it had been expanded with a new prologue and epilogue, perhaps written by Ben Jonson. In fact, Shakespeare's play was first registered on 8 November 1623, along with 15 other previously unpublished works, in preparation for the publication of the 1623 First Folio. Halliwell-Phillipps also took the view that the play performed in 1613 was an altogether different work.

These views are no longer held by most modern scholars. Plays offering positive portrayals of major Tudor figures like Henry VIII (When You See Me You Know Me) and Queen Elizabeth (If You Know Not Me, You Know Nobody by Thomas Heywood, 1605) were in fact performed, published, and re-published throughout the Stuart era. Since the play is now generally believed to be one of Shakespeare's collaborations with John Fletcher, the 1613 date is consistent with other such collaborations.

== Authorship ==
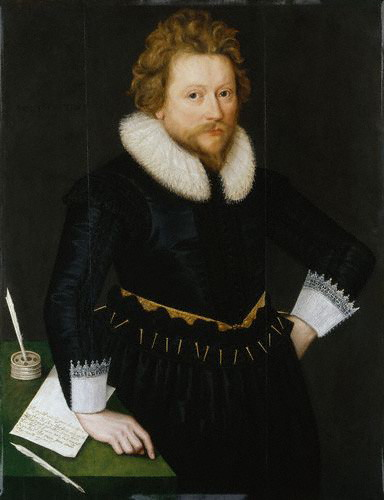
John Fletcher, probably the author of more than half of the play

The play was published as the work of Shakespeare, and was accepted as such by scholars until 1850, when the possibility of collaboration with John Fletcher was first raised by James Spedding, an expert on Francis Bacon. Fletcher was the writer who replaced Shakespeare as the principal playwright of the King's Men. He is known to have collaborated with Shakespeare on other plays, but there is no contemporary evidence of it for this play; the evidence lies in the style of the verse, which in some scenes appears closer to Fletcher's typical style than Shakespeare's. It is also not known whether Fletcher's involvement can be characterised as collaboration or revision, though the apparent division of scenes between the writers strongly suggests the former.

Spedding and other early commentators relied on a range of distinctive features in Fletcher's style and language preferences, which they saw in the Shakespearean play. For the next century the question of dual authorship was controversial, with more evidence accumulating in favour of the collaborative hypothesis. In 1966, Erdman and Fogel could write that "today a majority of scholars accept the theory of Fletcher's partial authorship, though a sturdy minority deny it."

An influential stylistic or stylometric study was undertaken by Cyrus Hoy, who in 1962 divided the play between Shakespeare and Fletcher based on their distinctive word choices, for example Fletcher's uses of ye for you and 'em for them. In the mid-nineteenth century, James Spedding had proposed a similar division based on the use of eleven-syllable lines; he arrived at the same conclusions Hoy would reach a century later. The Spedding-Hoy division is generally accepted, although subsequent studies have questioned some of its details.

The most common delineation of the two poets' shares in the play is this:

Shakespeare: Act I, scenes i and ii; II,iii and iv; III,ii, lines 1–203 (to exit of King); V,i.
Fletcher: Prologue; I,iii and iv; II,i and ii; III,i, and ii, 203–458 (after exit of King); IV,i and ii; V ii–v; Epilogue.

== Performance ==
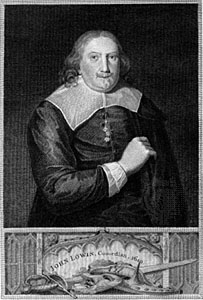
John Lowin, possibly the first actor to play Henry

Henry VIII is believed to have been first performed as part of the ceremonies celebrating the marriage of Princess Elizabeth in 1612–1613, although the first recorded performance was on 29 June 1613. The performance is especially noteworthy because of the fire that destroyed the Globe Theatre during the performance, as described in several contemporary documents. These confirm that the fire took place on that date. The King's Men were able to continue performances at the Blackfriars Theatre, their indoor playhouse, a venue having particular significance for contemporary audiences as it was the real location of the powerful trial scene in the play.

One often reported tradition associated with the play involves John Downes, prompter of the Duke of York's Company from 1662 to 1706. In his Roscius Anglicanus (1708), Downes claims that the role of Henry VIII in this play was originally performed by John Lowin, who "had his instructions from Mr. Shakespeare himself."

Fifteen years to the day after the fire, on 29 June 1628, The King's Men performed the play again at the Globe. The performance was witnessed by George Villiers, the contemporary Duke of Buckingham (no relation to the Duke of Buckingham portrayed in the play), who left half-way through, once the play's Duke of Buckingham was executed. (A month later, Villiers was assassinated.)

During the Restoration era, Sir William Davenant staged a production, starring Thomas Betterton, that was seen by Pepys. Thomas Betterton played Henry in 1664, and Colley Cibber revived it frequently in the 1720s. A revival produced by Charles Calvert, who also played Wolsey, at the Theatre Royal in Manchester, opening on 29 August 1877, premiered music for the fifth act composed by Arthur Sullivan. Other Victorian stagings of the play were by David Garrick, Charles Kean, Henry Irving (who chose to play Wolsey, the villain and perhaps the showier role of the play, in 1888, with Ellen Terry as the noble Katherine of Aragon). The longest Broadway run the play has had is Herbert Beerbohm Tree's 1916 production in which Lyn Harding played Henry and Tree played Wolsey, running 63 performances. Tree's production was notable for its elaborate exploitation of the play's pageantry, typical of the expensive and spectacular staging of the era. The production subsequently toured, with Sydney Greenstreet taking over the title role.

== Modern revivals ==
Queen Katherine and Patience by Charles Robert Leslie, 1842

The play's popularity has waned since the mid-twentieth century, although Charles Laughton played Henry at Sadler's Wells Theatre in 1933 and Margaret Webster directed it as the inaugural production of her American Repertory Company on Broadway in 1946 with Walter Hampden as Wolsey and Eva Le Gallienne as Katherine. John Gielgud played Wolsey, Harry Andrews the king and Edith Evans Katharine at Stratford in 1959.

Another notable production was the first at the reconstructed Shakespeare's Globe from 15 May to 21 August 2010, as part of the theatre's first season of Shakespeare's history plays, with cannon fire at the same point as the 1613 production and a cast including Dominic Rowan as Henry, Miranda Raison as Anne, Ian McNeice as Wolsey and Kate Duchêne as Katherine (with Raison also playing Anne in the same season's Anne Boleyn). It was staged at the Folger Shakespeare Theatre (Washington, D.C.) from 12 October until 28 November 2010; this production added a puppeter-narrator, played by Louis Butelli, named for Henry VIII's jester, Will Sommers, as well as the character of Mary I, played by Megan Steigerwald. A remount of that production also played at Alabama Shakespeare Festival in 2012.

In 2019 the play was done in repertory at the Studio Theatre at Canada's Stratford Festival. The production was filmed by Cineplex for broadcast in theatres; it has also aired on CBC in Canada.

== See also ==
- Cultural depictions of Henry VIII
- List of William Shakespeare screen adaptations
