= Ving Rhames =

American actor (born 1959)

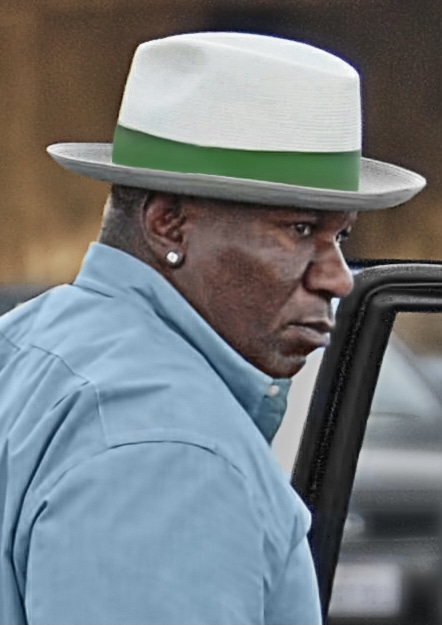
- Rhames in 2010
- Born: Irving Rameses Rhames; May 12, 1959 (age 67); New York City, U.S.
- Education: Juilliard School (BFA)
- Occupation: Actor
- Years active: 1983–present
- Spouses: Valerie Scott (m. 1994; div. 1999); Deborah Reed (m. 2000)
- Children: 3

Irving Rameses Rhames (/ˈreɪmz/ RAYMZ; born May 12, 1959) is an American actor. Born and raised in Harlem, New York City, he studied drama at SUNY Purchase before transferring to the Juilliard School, graduating with a Bachelor of Fine Arts in 1983. After early stage work in Shakespeare and contemporary plays, he made his screen debut in 1985 and gained attention through roles in Jacob's Ladder (1990), The People Under the Stairs (1991), and as Marsellus Wallace in Quentin Tarantino’s Pulp Fiction (1994). Rhames achieved further recognition as Luther Stickell in the Mission: Impossible film series, appearing in all eight installments.

His other notable work includes Con Air (1997), Rosewood (1997), Out of Sight (1998), Dawn of the Dead (2004), and voicing Cobra Bubbles in Disney’s Lilo & Stitch (2002). In 1998, he won a Golden Globe for portraying boxing promoter Don King in Don King: Only in America, memorably giving the award to fellow nominee Jack Lemmon. Alongside film and television, Rhames has worked extensively in theater, voice acting, and commercial narration.

== Early life and education ==
Rhames was born and raised in Harlem, New York City, the son of Reather, a homemaker, and Ernest Rhames, an auto mechanic whose parents were South Carolina sharecroppers. He was named "Irving" after NBC journalist Irving R. Levine.

Unlike many of his childhood friends, Rhames neither took drugs nor succumbed to easy street money, but rather played football for Convent Avenue Baptist Church in the Hamilton Heights Historic District. One of Rhames' junior high school teachers praised his poetry reading. On a whim, he applied to New York's High School of Performing Arts, where he developed his love of acting. After high school, he studied drama at SUNY Purchase, where fellow acting student Stanley Tucci gave him his nickname "Ving". Rhames later transferred to the Juilliard School's Drama Division (Group 12: 1979–1983) where he graduated with a Bachelor of Fine Arts degree in 1983, and began acting in Shakespeare in the Park the following Monday.

== Career ==
=== Stage ===
Rhames' training in the classics gained him roles as early as 1983 at Shakespeare in the Park in Richard III. He has also appeared in the classics Richard II, and Sophocles' play Ajax, as well as off-Broadway productions such as Map of the World and Ascension Day, and regionally in plays by Henrik Ibsen and Molière.

Rhames played the role of amateur boxer Omar in the Second Stage Theater 1984-85 revival of Miguel Piñero's 1974 prison drama Short Eyes directed by Kevin Conway, alongside Paul Calderon and Laurence Fishburne, among others.

On Broadway appeared in John Pielmeier's play The Boys of Winter directed by Michael Lindsay-Hogg in December 1985 at the Biltmore Theatre.

In an interview, Rhames commented about screen versus stage roles, "I don't give Hollywood the power to limit me," and "I can always do theater, I can do Ibsen, I can do Macbeth, I can do Chekhov, I can do Molière, Othello, I can do Richard III."

=== Screen ===
==== 1985–1989: Early television and film appearances ====
Rhames' screen debut came in January 1985 in the role of Young Gabriel on the PBS anthology series American Playhouse in the television film Go Tell It on the Mountain, which was followed by small roles in television and film. Rhames' theatrical film debut came next in 1986 as Jack in Native Son, based on the 1940 novel by Richard Wright.

Other 80s film appearances include roles in Paul Schrader's biographical crime drama Patty Hearst (1988) as Donald "Cinque Mtume" DeFreeze, and as Lieutenant Reilly in Brian De Palma's drama Casualties of War (1989).

On television, Rhames had two guest appearances on Miami Vice; as Georges in "The Maze" (February 1985), and as Walker Monroe in "Child's Play" (1987). In 1986 he appeared on another Michael Mann show, Crime Story in the 1986 episode, "Abrams for the Defense" in which he portrayed Hector Lincoln, a poor Chicago tenant who assaults his landlord after Hector's son is bitten by a rat, and must therefore be defended by Stephen Lang's character, David Abrams. He played Czaja Carnek on the soap opera Another World for several episodes in 1986. He played SP4 Tucker in the Tour of Duty episode "Burn Baby, Burn" (1987). Rhames played Henry Brown on Spenser: For Hire in the episode "McAllister" (1988).

==== 1990–1999: Breakout roles ====
During the 1990s, Rhames' theatrical film appearances included George in Adrian Lyne's psychological horror Jacob's Ladder (1990), and Wes Craven's comedy horror film The People Under the Stairs (1991) as Leroy. Also in 1991, he played Frank McRae, the master chief petty officer in John Milius' Vietnam war film Flight of the Intruder. As Secret Service agent Duane Stevensen, he watched over Kevin Kline's character in the political comedy film Dave (1993). He played street hustler "Little Leroy" in Tim Hunter's drama The Saint of Fort Washington (1993).

One of Rhames' breakout roles includes Marsellus Wallace which came in Quentin Tarantino's 1994 crime film Pulp Fiction. Another breakout, and recurring, role came in 1996 as ace computer hacker Luther Stickell opposite Tom Cruise in Brian De Palma's film adaptation, Mission: Impossible. Due to its success, Rhames reprises the character in subsequent films. In 1997, Rhames portrayed the character of Nathan "Diamond Dog" Jones in the popular film Con Air.

Other film roles during the 90s include FBI Agent Omar in Kiss of Death (1995), the wisecracking bouncer/bodyguard Shad in Striptease (1996), and a starring role as West African drug dealer Muki in the action thriller Dangerous Ground (1997) with Ice Cube and Elizabeth Hurley. In John Singleton's 1997 historical drama Rosewood, Rhames played Mann, a veteran of WWI who is now a drifter falsely accused of assault by a white woman, eliciting a lynch mob. Although Rhames' character is fictional, Rosewood is based on a true story of the 1923 Rosewood massacre. In 1998, he played Pike in the crime thriller Body Count, and Buddy Bragg in the action comedy Out of Sight. He played Jesus-praising paramedic Marcus in the drama film Bringing Out the Dead (1999) directed by Martin Scorsese.

On television, Rhames played Dr. Peter Benton's brother-in-law on the medical drama ER, a recurring role he filled for three seasons from 1994 to 1996. Rhames won a Golden Globe in 1998 for Best Actor – Miniseries or Television Film in HBO's Don King: Only in America (1997). At the ceremony he gave his award to fellow nominee Jack Lemmon, saying, "I feel that being an artist is about giving, and I'd like to give this to you." Lemmon was clearly touched by the gesture as was the celebrity audience who gave Lemmon a standing ovation. Lemmon, who tried unsuccessfully to give the award back to Rhames, said it was "one of the nicest, sweetest moments I've ever known in my life." The Hollywood Foreign Press Association announced later that they would have a duplicate award prepared for Rhames. That moment was #98 on E!'s 101 Awesome Moments in Entertainment. The New York Times lauded Rhames for the act, writing that in doing so he "demonstrated his capacity for abundant generosity".

==== 2000–present ====
Rhames reprises his role as Luther Stickell beginning in Mission: Impossible 2 (2000). He co-starred in Mission: Impossible III (2006), had a cameo appearance in Mission: Impossible – Ghost Protocol (2011), and played a major role in Mission: Impossible – Rogue Nation (2015), Mission: Impossible – Fallout (2018), Mission: Impossible – Dead Reckoning Part One (2023) and Mission: Impossible – The Final Reckoning (2025), the fifth, sixth, seventh and eighth installments in the Mission Impossible film series, respectively. He is the only actor besides Tom Cruise to appear in all eight Mission: Impossible films.

Other theatrical film roles include Johnnie Cochran in American Tragedy (2000), and the ex-con boyfriend of Jody's mother in the John Singleton film Baby Boy (2001). He contributed his voice for the character of Cobra Bubbles in the Walt Disney animated feature film Lilo & Stitch (2002) and the subsequent television series. Rhames played police Sergeant Kenneth Hall, a stoic cop and former Marine, fighting zombie hordes in the 2004 remake of Dawn of the Dead. He played a different character, military Captain Kenneth Rhodes, in the 2008 remake of Day of the Dead. Rhames played a gay (and possibly also homicidal) firefighter who comes out of the closet in I Now Pronounce You Chuck and Larry (2007). In the 2008 film Saving God, he played an ex-con who is released from prison a changed man, looking to take over his father's former church congregation in a deteriorating neighborhood. Rhames stars in Phantom Punch (2008), a biopic of boxer Sonny Liston, released directly to DVD, as well as the British independent action/thriller film The Tournament (2009), portraying a fighter out to win a no-rules tournament.

On television Rhames portrayed a gay drag queen in the television film Holiday Heart (2000). He played John Morgan in Hallmark Hall of Fame's film Little John (2002). In March 2005, Rhames played the lead role on a new Kojak series, on the USA Network cable channel (and on ITV4 in the UK). The bald head, lollipops, and "Who loves ya, baby?" catchphrase remained intact, but little else remained from the Telly Savalas-starring original. It was announced that he would have a role in the 2006 Aquaman-based show Mercy Reef; however, due to the integration of The WB and UPN for the new network, CW, Mercy Reef was not picked up. He narrated the BET television series American Gangster (2006–2009).

=== Other works ===
Rhames makes an appearance in Ludacris's song "Southern Gangstas" on his 2008 album Theater of the Mind. Rappers Playaz Circle and Rick Ross are also featured on the track.

Rhames voiced the part of Tobias Jones in the video game Driver 3 (2004).

He filmed The Red Canvas (2009) with Ernie Reyes Jr., UFC lightweight contender Gray Maynard, and Randy Couture. In 2010, he filed a lawsuit against the film's producer, claiming that he had only been paid $175,000 of a $200,000 contract.

Since 2014, Rhames has provided the narration for numerous Arby's commercials, with the slogan "Arby's: We have the meats!"

In 2015, he filmed a series of commercials for The ADT Corporation. Rhames has also appeared in a series of television commercials for RadioShack, usually performing with Vanessa L. Williams.

Rhames is one of the narrators for UFC.

Rhames narrated the team introductions for the New England Patriots and Atlanta Falcons in Super Bowl LI in February 2017.

== Personal life ==
Rhames is a Christian. In 1994 he married Valerie Scott, a former movie publicist. He has since divorced, and has been married to Deborah Reed since 2000.

== Filmography ==
Key
†	Denotes works that have not yet been released

=== Film ===
Ving Rhames film credits
Year	Title	Role	Notes	Ref.
1986	Native Son	Jack	Theatrical film debut	
1988	Patty Hearst	Cinque Mtume		
1989	Casualties of War	Lieutenant Reilly		
1990	The Long Walk Home	Herbert Cotter		
1990	Jacob's Ladder	George		
1991	Flight of the Intruder	Chief Petty Officer Frank McRae		
1991	Homicide	Robert Randolph		
1991	The People Under the Stairs	Leroy		
1992	Stop! Or My Mom Will Shoot	"Mr. Stereo"		
1993	Blood In Blood Out	Ivan		
1993	Dave	Duane Stevenson		
1993	The Saint of Fort Washington	Leroy "Little Leroy"		
1994	Pulp Fiction	Marsellus Wallace		
1994	Drop Squad	Garvey		
1995	Kiss of Death	FBI Agent Omar		
1996	Mission: Impossible	Luther Stickell		
1996	Striptease	"Shad"		
1997	Dangerous Ground	Muki		
1997	Rosewood	Mann		
1997	Con Air	Nathan "Diamond Dog" Jones		
1998	Body Count	Pike		
1998	Out of Sight	Buddy Bragg		
1999	Entrapment	FBI Agent Aaron Thibadeaux		
1999	Bringing Out the Dead	Marcus		
2000	Mission: Impossible 2	Luther Stickell		
2001	Baby Boy	Melvin		
2001	Final Fantasy: The Spirits Within	Ryan Whittaker		
2002	Undisputed	George "The Iceman" Chambers		
2002	Lilo & Stitch	Cobra Bubbles (voice)		
2002	Dark Blue	Deputy Chief Arthur Holland		
2003	Stitch! The Movie	Cobra Bubbles (voice)	Direct-to-video	
2003	Sin	Eddie Burns		
2004	Dawn of the Dead	Sergeant Kenneth Hall		
2005	Back in the Day	Joe "J-Bone" Brown		
2005	Animal	James "Animal" Allen	Video	
2005	Shooting Gallery	Carl "Cue Ball Carl" Bridgers	Video	
2006	Mission: Impossible III	Luther Stickell		
2006	Leroy & Stitch	Cobra Bubbles (voice)	Direct-to-video	
2006	Idlewild	"Spats"		
2007	Ascension Day	Hark	Video	
2007	I Now Pronounce You Chuck & Larry	Fred G. Duncan		
2007	A Broken Life	Vet		
2008	Animal 2	James "Animal" Allen		
2008	Day of the Dead	Captain Kenneth Rhodes	Video	
2008	Phantom Punch	Sonny Liston		
2008	Saving God	Armstrong Cane		
2009	Echelon Conspiracy	FBI Agent Dave Grant		
2009	Give 'Em Hell, Malone	"Boulder"		
2009	The Goods: Live Hard, Sell Hard	"Jibby" Newsome		
2009	The Bridge to Nowhere	Nate		
2009	The Tournament	Joshua Harlow		
2009	Surrogates	The Prophet		
2009	Evil Angel	Detective Carruthers		
2010	Master Harold...and the Boys	Sam		
2010	Love Chronicles: Secrets Revealed	Mike	Video	
2010	Operation: Endgame	"Judgement"		
2010	Piranha 3D	Deputy Fallon		
2010	King of the Avenue	Norman De'Sha		
2010	The Wrath of Cain	Miles "Cain" Skinner		
2010	Red Canvas	Gene		
2010	Death Race 2	R. H. Weyland	Video	
2011	The River Murders	Captain Art Langley		
2011	Pimp Bullies	Miguel		
2011	Julia X	The Man		
2011	Mission: Impossible – Ghost Protocol	Luther Stickell	Uncredited cameo	
2012	Seven Below	Jack		
2012	Piranha 3DD	Deputy Fallon		
2012	Soldiers of Fortune	Grimaud "Grim Reaper" Tourneur		
2012	Money Fight	Gene		
2012	Art of Submission	Gene		
2012	Won't Back Down	Principal Thompson		
2012	Mafia	Renzo Wes		
2012	Btd	Ken	Short	
2013	Death Race 3: Inferno	R. H. Weyland	Video	
2013	Armed Response	Officer Hall		
2013	Force of Execution	"Ice Man"	Video	
2014	Jamesy Boy	Conrad		
2015	Mission: Impossible – Rogue Nation	Luther Stickell		
2015	Operator	Richard		
2016	A Sunday Horse	Mr. Valentine		
2017	Guardians of the Galaxy Vol. 2	Charlie-27		
2017	The Star	Thaddeus (voice)		
2017	Father Figures	Rod Hamilton		
2018	Con Man	"Peanut"		
2018	Mission: Impossible – Fallout	Luther Stickell		
2022	Wendell & Wild	Buffalo Belzer (voice)		
2023	The Locksmith	Frank		
2023	Mission: Impossible – Dead Reckoning Part One	Luther Stickell		
2024	The Garfield Movie	Otto (voice)		
2024	The Instigators	Frank Toomey		
2024	The Wild Robot	Thunderbolt (voice)		
2025	Mission: Impossible – The Final Reckoning	Luther Stickell		
2025	Uppercut	Elliott Duffond		
2026	The Mongoose †	Tanker	Post-production	

=== Television ===
Ving Rhames television credits
Year	Title	Role	Notes	Ref.
1985	Go Tell It on the Mountain	Young Gabriel Grimes	Television film. PBS American Playhouse (aired 1/14/1985) (screen debut)	
1985	Miami Vice	Georges	Episode: "The Maze"	
1986	Another World	Czaja Carnek	Regular cast (8 episodes)	
1986	Crime Story	Hector Lincoln	Episode: "Abrams for the Defense"	
1987	Miami Vice	Walker Monroe	Episode: "Child's Play"	
1987	Tour of Duty	SP4 Tucker	Episode: "Burn Baby, Burn"	
1988	Spenser: For Hire	Henry Brown	Episode: "McAllister"	
1989	Men	Charlie Hazard	Main cast	
1989	The Equalizer	Luther Paxton	Episode: "Suicide Squad"	
1990	Rising Son	Ed	Television film	
1990	When You Remember Me	Leon	Television film	
1991	ScreenPlay	Sergeant Blue	Episode: "Murder in Oakland"	
1991	Iran: Days of Crisis	Charles Jones	Television film	
1992	Terror on Track 9	"Jellyroll"	Television film	
1994	Philly Heat	DeWitt Wardlaw	TV series	
1994–1996	ER	Walter Robbins	Recurring cast (season 1–3)	
1995	Ed McBain's 87th Precinct: Lightning	Detective Artie Brown	Television film	
1995	New York Undercover	Max Villareal	Episode: "Olde Thyme Religion"	
1995	Deadly Whispers	Detective Jackson	Television film	
1997	Don King: Only in America	Don King	Television film	
2000	American Tragedy	Johnnie Cochran	Television film	
2000	Holiday Heart	"Holiday" Heart	Television film	
2001	UC: Undercover	Quito Real	Recurring cast	
2002	Sins of the Father	Garrick Jones	Television film	
2002	Little John	John Morgan	Television film. Hallmark Hall of Fame	
2002	RFK	Judge Thomas R. Jones	Television film	
2002	The Proud Family	Garrett Krebs (voice)	Episode: "A Hero for Halloween"	
2002–2003	The District	Attorney General Troy Hatcher	Recurring cast (season 3)	
2003	Lilo & Stitch: The Series	Cobra Bubbles (Note: Experiment 300, also known as Spooky, disguised as Cobra Bubbles) (voice)	Episode: "Spooky"	
2003	The Adventures of Jimmy Neutron: Boy Genius	Chief (voice)	Episode: "Operation: Rescue Jet Fusion"	
2003	The System	Andre Charles	Main cast	
2003	Freedom: A History of US	Various Roles	TV documentary series	
2005	Kojak	Lieutenant Theo Kojak	Main cast	
2006	Aquaman	McCaffery	Television film	
2007	Football Wives	Frank Wallingford	Television film	
2010	Gravity	"Dogg" McFee	Main cast	
2011	Zombie Apocalypse	Henry Everlen	Television film	
2011	Black Jack	Jack "Black Jack"	Television film	
2013	Monday Mornings	Dr. Jorge Villanueva	Main cast	
2014	A Day Late and a Dollar Short	Cecil Price	Television film	
2018	Cagney and Lacey	Captain Stark	Television film	
2019	Voice Arts Awards	Himself - Icon Award	Television special	
2023	Legacy	Guy Simmons	Television miniseries. BET+	
2025	Dope Thief	Bart Driscoll	Television miniseries	
2026	History's Deadliest with Ving Rhames	Himself - Host	TV documentary series	

=== Video games ===
Ving Rhames television credits
Year	Title	Role	Notes	Ref.
2003	Mission: Impossible – Operation Surma	IMF Agent Luther Stickell		
2004	Driver 3	Tobias Jones		
2017	Call of Duty: WWII	Jefferson Potts		

== Awards and nominations ==
Year	Award	Category	Work	Result	Ref.
1998	Golden Globe Awards	Best Actor in Mini-Series or Motion Picture	Don King: Only in America	Won	
1998	Primetime Emmy Awards	Best Actor in Mini-Series or Movie	Don King: Only in America	Nominated	
1998	Acalpulco Black Film Festival	Best Actor	Rosewood	Nominated	
1998	Image Awards	Outstanding Actor in Motion Picture	Rosewood	Nominated	
1998	Image Awards	Outstanding Actor in Television or Mini-Series	Don King: Only in America	Nominated	
1998	Satellite Awards	Best Actor - Mini-Series or TV Film	Don King: Only in America	Nominated	
1998	Screen Actors Guild Awards	Best Actor - Mini-Series or TV Film	Don King: Only in America	Nominated	
2000	Blockbuster Entertainment Awards	Best Supporting Actor - Action	Entrapment	Nominated	
2000	Satellite Awards	Best Supporting Actor - Comedy or Music	Bringing Out the Dead	Nominated	
2000	ShoWest Convention	Best Supporting Actor		Won	
2001	Black Reel Awards	Best Actor - Network	Holiday Heart	Nominated	
2001	Image Awards	Best Supporting Actor - Motion Picture	Mission: Impossible 2	Nominated	
2001	Locarno International Film Festival	Special Mention	Baby Boy	Won	
2002	Black Reel Awards	Best Supporting Actor	Baby Boy	Nominated	
2002	Image Awards	Outstanding Actor in a Drama Series	UC: Undercover	Nominated	
2002	Image Awards	Supporting Actor in a Motion Picture	Baby Boy	Nominated	
2003	Black Reel Awards	Best Actor - Mini-Series	Sins of the Father	Nominated	
2003	Image Awards	Best Supporting Actor - Comedy	The Proud Family	Nominated	
2003	Image Awards	Best Actor - Mini-Series or TV Film	Sins of the Father	Nominated	
2004	Black Reel Awards	Best Supporting Actor	Dark Blue	Nominated	
2006	Black Reel Awards	Best Actor - Television	Kojak	Nominated	
2015	Black Reel Awards	Best Actor - Television	A Day Late and a Dollar Short	Nominated	
2015	Image Awards	Best Actor - Television	A Day Late and a Dollar Short	Nominated	

== See also ==
- List of people from Harlem
