= Final Fu =

American reality television show

- Starring: Ernie Reyes Jr. and Competitors
- Country of origin: United States
- No. of episodes: 20 episodes

Production
- Running time: approx. 22-26 minutes

Original release
- Network: MTV2
- Release: July 17 – August 11, 2006

Final Fu is an American reality television show that first aired on MTV2 on July 17, 2006, and ran for a single season of twenty episodes The show was hosted by Ernie Reyes, Jr., and featured practitioners of various styles of martial arts competing in one-on-one semi-contact point sparring matches and group competitions.

== Notable competitors ==
- Lauren Cahoon
- Ruby Lopez
- Matt Mullins

== Scoring ==
The reality competition is based on stand-up only, continuous point sparring. The target area is the upper leg and torso. No contact to the lower legs, back, groin, and head are allowed. There are also other areas where striking is not allowed, for instance, in one episode, a competitor is warned for striking the opponent on the left side hip.

The point system goes as follows:

- 1 point for kicks to the target areas
- 2 points for "punching techniques" (i.e., punches) to the target areas
- 3 points for jumping kicks and spinning back kicks.
- 4 points for spinning jump kicks

Warnings and point deductions are given for the following reasons:

- Unnecessary roughness, Lack of control
- Striking the head, back, or outside the target area

Timidity (excessive lack of action/avoiding the other fighter) has occurred several times, but nobody has been punished for it.

== Winners ==
=== Weekly ===
The Top 4 from each week move onto the final week, which aired August 7, 2006. The Top 4 from each week are as follows (Alphabetically):

Week 1: Jessica Mellon, Jonathan Phan, Bryan Rogers, and Hans Wikkeling

Week 2: Ilram Choi, Brian Hilliard, and Jackson Spidell

Week 3: Chris Brewster, Justin Cox, Michelle Spencer, Daniel Sterling

=== Final week results ===
Two contestants, unbeknownst to the fighters, would be eliminated after their first challenge on Monday, leaving ten competitors. They were: Jessica Mellon, and Hans Wikkeling

After the last challenge and the first round of fights, the four contestants who had the lowest overall scores departed on Wednesday, leaving six competitors. They were: Jessen Noviello, Jonathan Phan, Bryan Rogers and Michelle Spencer.

A six-person competition continued the contest on Thursday. During this day the six remaining contestants had a 1-minute match with each of the other five contestants, leading to a total of 15 matches. The four individuals with the lowest overall scores departed the competition. They were: Chris Brewster, Ilram Choi, Justin Cox, and Brian Hilliard

The two final contestants for Friday were Daniel Sterling and Jackson Spidell. One three round fight between these two determined fighters would decide the winner of the month-long competition. After a very close fight, with both competitors putting it all on the line, Sterling won the final match with a score of 126 points over Spidell's 118.

The win earned Sterling $25,000, trips to Japan, Korea, and China, and the title of the Final Fu.
