= Surf Ninjas =

- Theatrical release poster
- Directed by: Neal Israel
- Written by: Dan Gordon; Neal Israel
- Produced by: Evzen Kolar
- Starring: Ernie Reyes Jr.; Rob Schneider; Tone Lōc; John Karlen; Ernie Reyes Sr.; Leslie Nielsen
- Cinematography: Arthur Albert; Victor Hammer
- Edited by: Tom Walls
- Music by: David Kitay
- Distributed by: New Line Cinema
- Release date: August 20, 1993
- Running time: 87 minutes
- Country: United States
- Language: English
- Budget: $6.5 million
- Box office: $4.9 million (USA)

Surf Ninjas is a 1993 American family comedy film involving martial arts, that follows two teenage surfers from Los Angeles who discover that they are crown princes of the Asian kingdom Patusan and reluctantly follow their destinies to dethrone an evil colonel that rules over the kingdom. It is directed by Neal Israel and written by Dan Gordon. The film stars Ernie Reyes Jr., Rob Schneider, Nicolas Cowan, and Leslie Nielsen.

Surf Ninjas was filmed in Los Angeles, Hawaii, and Thailand. A video game was also developed and released in conjunction with the film. It was released in the United States on August 20, 1993, being received generally unfavorably by critics. The film was released on VHS in December 1993 and re-released on DVD in September 2002.

== Plot ==
Johnny and Adam are teenage surfers who live in Los Angeles with their father, Mac. Two weeks before Johnny's 16th birthday, ninjas attack the teenagers, but they are defeated by Zatch, a mysterious warrior with an eye patch. A follow-up attack results in Mac's kidnapping, though Zatch is able to protect the teenagers and their friend Iggy from the ninjas. Adam discovers that the video game on his Game Gear matches the events happening around him and finds he can control some events through his Sega. Zatch reveals to Johnny and Adam that they are actually the sons of the king of Patusan, whose land and monarchy was overthrown by the evil Colonel Chi when the boys were young. Zatch claims it was their destiny to return to Patusan, overthrow Colonel Chi, and free the people. Zatch takes them to the East Asian district of "Little Patusan" in Los Angeles, where Johnny is introduced to a Patusani princess, Ro-May, who has been betrothed to Johnny since they were infants.

Ninjas again attack, but Johnny's abilities as a warrior prince emerge and he defeats several of his foes. Johnny, Adam, Iggy, Zatch, and Ro-May decide to return to Patusan. They are followed by a Los Angeles detective, Lieutenant Spence, who had been investigating the ninja attacks. They reach Patusan and discover what Colonel Chi's rule has wrought, including a burned village and a chain gang of political prisoners. Spotted by the guards, Johnny and Adam defeat them, and free the villagers from their captivity.

Zatch leads the crew to a hidden cave in which the ancient weapons of the Patusani monarchy are preserved. Zatch arms Johnny and attacks him to prepare him for future challenges. Johnny is beaten repeatedly, but he is finally able to disarm Zatch. Rallying the villagers, they travel to the coast, opposite from an island that houses the royal city and Colonel Chi's dungeon. Unable to go by boat due to an impassable reef, Johnny and Adam tell the Patusanis to craft surfboards. They then paddle and surf to the unguarded side of the island.

Landing on the island, Johnny and Zatch lead the attack on the royal city, taking down Chi's henchmen and freeing Mac. During the battle, Zatch is revealed to be the boys' paternal uncle. Johnny confronts Colonel Chi, successfully defeating him by knocking him into a body of water with the help of Adam and his Game Gear. With Chi's rule undone, peace is restored to Patusan. Johnny is seated as the heralded warrior prince with Ro-May as his princess and Adam as a prince. Johnny declares the monarchy to be dissolved and announces that Patusan will operate as a democracy. His reason for doing this is for the people to finally be free of rule, good or evil.

== Cast ==
- Ernie Reyes Jr. as Johnny, a surfer boy who is the rightful heir to the Patusani throne
- Nicolas Cowan as Adam, Johnny's younger brother who is second-in-line for the Patusani throne
- Rob Schneider as Iggy, Johnny's surfing buddy
- Leslie Nielsen as Colonel Chi, a ruthless warlord who took the power of Patusan by force, has mechanical bodyparts as a result of the coup
- Tone Loc as Lieutenant Spence, LAPD detective investigating Mac's kidnapping
- John Karlen as Mac, Johnny and Adam's foster father
- Ernie Reyes Sr. as Zatch, Johnny and Adam's uncle and Patusani ninja who lost his eye during the coup
- Kelly Hu as Ro-May, another Patusani refugee whom Johnny was betrothed to
- Nathan Jung as Manchu, Colonel Chi's right-hand man
- Keone Young as Baba Ram

== Production and video game ==
Surf Ninjas was filmed during the summer of 1992. Filming locations included Thailand and Hawaii. The second half of the film was shot first, and the crew moved to Los Angeles to film the first half. New Line Cinema and Sega of America established a financial relationship in which a Game Gear video game would be developed for the film. Game designers began developing the video game Surf Ninjas when the film was only in its scripting phase, receiving creative input from director Neal Israel. In conjunction with the Game Gear title, a Genesis game was also planned. In turn, Sega partially financed the film. According to Cowan, the inclusion of the Game Gear was made after suggestions were made to at first use a Game Boy.

Screenwriter Dan Gordon said that he wrote action sequences that would both suit the film and serve as a springboard for the video game. In the film, one of the lead characters is shown playing the Surf Ninjas video game on a Game Gear. The video game was released in August, before the film's release, and it was considered the first movie-based video game to precede the film itself.

Surf Ninjas video games were also released for the Amiga 1200 computer and CD32 console in 1994 by Flair Software/MicroValue.

== Release ==
The studio New Line Cinema released Surf Ninjas two weeks earlier than its commercial release date in Evansville, Indiana and Lubbock, Texas as part of a test of regional markets. The early release marked the first time that a major film was released in Evansville before its national opening without any local ties. The president of theatrical marketing at New Line, Chris Pula, selected Evansville for its family-oriented audiences. Pula explained: "Evansville is traditionally a strong family market. Also, we have a strong relationship with the exhibitors in that area". The president said that the studio was testing the film in a larger market than usual due to its uncertainty about the film's reception and that the studio would measure its marketing success with ticket receipts.

Surf Ninjas was widely released in 1,321 theaters in the United States on August 20, 1993. Over its opening weekend, the film grossed $2 million, placing 13th in box office rankings, ahead of Manhattan Murder Mystery. Surf Ninjas ultimately grossed $4.9 million in the United States. The film was released on VHS on January 5, 1994. It was subsequently released on DVD on September 3, 2002.

== Reception ==
On the review aggregator website Rotten Tomatoes, 23% of 22 critics' reviews are positive, with an average rating of 4.10/10.

Janet Maslin of The New York Times called most of Surf Ninjas "only mindlessly watchable" and called the film "another of Hollywood's efforts to prove that the American mall mentality is at home in any corner of the globe". Maslin also found the film to lack in actual surfing content. Lynn Voedisch of the Chicago Sun-Times described Surf Ninjas as "a marriage of pop icons that simply was fated to be", citing children's love for ninjas, especially the Teenage Mutant Ninja Turtles, and for the surf culture. Voedisch considered Rob Schneider's presence as comic relief unfunny, believing that Leslie Nielsen should have received more screen time as the dictator. Calvin Wilson of The Kansas City Star called the film "a disgrace... even by Hollywood standards", seeing it as a mess of child lead roles, unfunny cameo roles by Schneider and Nielsen, martial arts action, and lame jokes. Wilson considered the story "stale and uninspired" that involved "people we don't care about doing things we can't believe".

Stephen Hunter of The Baltimore Sun thought the film's lead, Ernie Reyes, Jr., was too old (20) and too muscular to be received believably as a 15-year-old. Hunter otherwise found the Reyeses impressive in terms of their fighting skills, though he found the film's martial arts sequences to be "bloodless and absurd". Hunter also criticized the director for depriving the film of personality, with its lack of danger, seriousness, or spontaneity. Richard Harrington of The Washington Post found the film to be "a harmless summer's entertainment" for young people who enjoyed the Teenage Mutant Ninja Turtles films and 3 Ninjas. Harrington enjoyed Reyes, Jr. as the protagonist but found Nielsen to be disappointing. Paul Sherman of the Boston Herald thought that Surf Ninjas was "little more than a succession of dudespeak, surfing, skateboarding, video games, generic rock soundtrack and strained knucklehead humor". Sherman admired the story arc in which the protagonists learn to accept their destinies, but he thought that "the manufactured thrills along the way get obnoxious". Sherman thought that the film would only appeal to children under 12 years old, though the film's locations in Thailand in the second half added an exotic atmosphere.

Desmond Ryan of The Philadelphia Inquirer thought that Leslie Nielsen was deceptively portrayed in a major role similar to that of Lieutenant Frank Drebin from The Naked Gun films, instead having merely "a running and unfunny gag about his malfunctioning answering machine and generally wasted otherwise". Ryan also found the film's dialogue to be "painful" and considered Surf Ninjas to be "beyond airheaded". Mick LaSalle of the San Francisco Chronicle considered the story of Surf Ninjas to be "harmless and painfully dull". LaSalle thought that the pacing of the film was too long with only "two smirks over the course of 90 minutes". Sean Piccoli of The Washington Times thought that the film's "dull stretch" was buoyed by the presence of Rob Schneider. Piccoli compared the martial arts choreography in the film to the "cartoon fantasies that little boys re-enact on neighbors' lawns: the good guys, alone and outnumbered by the charging horde, air-punch their way to glory".

Ron Weiskind of the Pittsburgh Post-Gazette perceived Reyes, Jr. as "a likable presence on screen" and Schneider to be occasionally humorous in his series of gaffes. Weiskind thought that even with the abundance of martial arts in the film, the scenes were generally too lifeless. Joe Holleman of the St. Louis Post-Dispatch thought that Surf Ninjas pushed "the right buttons to guarantee adolescent enjoyment". Holleman acknowledged that the film was "not exactly a milestone in cinematic achievement", but he applauded the acrobatic choreography and the delivery of Schneider's throwaway lines in "the movie's funniest moments". Sean P. Means of The Salt Lake Tribune described the film as a Toys "R" Us version of Indiana Jones and the Temple of Doom, with "the cartoonish martial-arts sequences [owing] their entire existence to the villains' stupidity". Means thought that the film was ultimately "as silly as it is forgettable".
