= The Red Canvas =

2009 film

- Directed by: Kenneth Chamitoff; Adam Boster
- Written by: Kenneth Chamitoff
- Starring: Ernie Reyes, Jr. John Savage; George Takei
- Music by: James Peterson
- Release dates: May 8, 2009 (Germany); September 21, 2012 (United States)
- Country: United States
- Language: English
- Budget: $3 million

The Red Canvas is a martial arts drama about a ruthless Mixed Martial Arts tournament. It is the first film shot and completed on the Red One 4k camera. The film stars Ernie Reyes, Jr.

== Plot ==
Johnny Sanchez (Ernie Reyes, Jr.) has a troubled past which manifests in the dissonance between him and his family, particularly with his father and son. As Johnny gets released from prison, his father's garage is going to be shut down. The only way to save it is to fight in the Red Canvas tournament, an MMA event. Amidst preparing for an opponent who can't be defeated, Johnny must deal with the turmoil of his family and answer for mistakes of the past.

== Cast ==
- Ernie Reyes Jr. as Johnny Sanchez
- Matthias Hues as Matt
- Joe Nieves as Tony Lyndelli
- Rob Mars as Max
- Mariano 'Big Dawg' Mendoza as Pedro / Prison Guard (credited as Mariano Mendoza)
- Ken Takemoto as "Bang"
- Frank Shamrock as Ryder
- Mario Orozco as Rafael
- John Savage as Harbin Rask
- George Takei as General Krang
- Lee Reyes as Pablo
- Kim Do Nguyen as Lim
- Espirit Reyes as Olivia Sanchez
- Crystalina McMartin as Ryder's Girlfriend
- 'Crazy' Bob Cook as Himself
- Teresa Noreen as Ring Girl #1
- Tina-Elena Martinez as Ring Girl #2
- Matt Garcia as Stevens
- Joe Soltis as Joe Santini
- Alex Khanbabian as Pererra
- Jace Boster as "Way of The Guardian"
- Anthony Gooch as "Omega"
- Jeff Davidson as Himself
- David Fitzgerald as Bobby
- Lorri Connard as Tia Rosa
- Chris Divera as Navarra
- Randi Rayl as Torch's Hot Tub Girl
- Riz Angel as "Bolo"
- Shane Kawamura as Thorn
- Stephanie Hasegawa as Desert Bootcamp Girl
- Dilenia Grullon as Desert Bootcamp Girl
- Marvil Michaels as Desert Bootcamp Girl
- María Conchita Alonso as Maria Sanchez
- Ernie Reyes, Sr. as Diego Sanchez
- Ki Reyes as Oscar Sanchez
- Destiny Reyes as Bianca Sanchez
- Matt Connerd as Martial Arts Student
- Alexander Chamitoff as Martial Arts Student
- Sophia Chamitoff as Martial Arts Student
- Margie Betke as Martial Arts Student
- Kathy Long as Herself
- Dan Severn as Himself
- Tyson Griffin as Himself
- Jermaine Andre as Himself
- Chris Casamassa as Ring Announcer
- Fernanda Romero as Natania Sanchez
- Sara Downing as Julia
- Gray Maynard as "Torch"
- Tony Thompson as Referee
- Jean Claude Leuyer as Garage Thug Leader
- Vic Chao as Young General Krang
- Susan Savage as ER Doctor
- Shonie Carter as Club Posse
- Jessiah Rueckert as Young Harbin Rask
- Leslie Garza as Natania's Friend (credited as Leslie Garza Rivera)
- Kenneth Chamitoff as Russian Gambler
- Martin C. Alvillar as Hispanic Gambler
- Lisa Canning as Vanessa Fitzgerald
- T.J. Quicksilver as Fighter
- Arnold Chon as Lung
- Ving Rhames as Gene

== Awards ==
- Action on Film Festival 2008 Best Picture
- Action on Film Festival 2008 Male Action Performer of the Year - Ernie Reyes Jr.
- Action on Film Festival 2008 Best Feature Soundtrack
- Action on Film Festival 2008 Best Action Sequence Martial Arts
- Action on Film Festival 2008 Best Feature Supporting Actor - John Savage

== Alternate Titles ==
For whatever reasons, the film changed names multiple times. At the time the film's soundtrack was released by MovieScore Media, it was going by the title The Red Canvas. Alternatively known as Bloodsport: The Red Canvas. Other titles are The Cage Fighter: Pride vs. Honor, Ultimate Fighter, Money Fight, then finally in 2012 settled on Art of Submission. Most, if not all, of these titles came with different edits of the film, some with significant changes.
