= SS Jeddah =

Passenger steamship

History
- Name: SS Jeddah
- Namesake: Jeddah
- Owner: Singapore Steamship Company
- Port of registry: UK
- Builder: W.Denny & Brs., Dumbarton
- Launched: 1872
- Identification: Official number 67990

General characteristics
- Class & type: 100 A1 (Lloyds Register)
- Type: Steamship
- Tonnage: 1,030 NRT
- Length: 280 ft 0 in (85.3 m)
- Beam: 33 ft 2 in (10.1 m)
- Capacity: 1100 (crew + passengers)
- Crew: 50
- Notes: Abandoned

SS Jeddah was a British-flagged Singaporean-owned passenger steamship. It was built in 1872 in Dumbarton, UK, especially for the Hajj pilgrim trade, and was owned by Singapore-based merchant Syed Mahomed Alsagoff. In 1880, the officers onboard the Jeddah abandoned it when it listed and appeared to be sinking, leaving more than 900 passengers aboard. The event later inspired the plot of Joseph Conrad's novel Lord Jim. The vessel was retrieved and continued to sail, later being renamed Diamond.

== Incident ==
On 17 July 1880, Jeddah left Singapore bound for Penang (both Singapore and Penang were a part of the Straits Settlements), and subsequently Jeddah, then in the Ottoman Empire, with 953 passengers – 778 men, 147 women, and 67 children – aboard. It also had 600 tonnes of general cargo, mostly sugar, garron wood, and general merchandise. The passengers were Muslim pilgrims travelling to Mecca and Medina for pilgrimage. A nephew of the ship's owner, Syed Omar al-Sagoff (Arabic: سيد عمر السقاف Saiyid ʿUmar al-Saqqāf) was among the passengers. Its multinational crew included the captain (Joseph Lucas Clark), two European officers (the first mate, named Augustine "Austin" Podmore Williams, and the second mate), and a European third engineer. The captain's wife, who was also a European, was also aboard.

On 3 August 1880, while off Ras Hafun in hurricane-force winds and heavy seas, the ship's boilers moved from their seatings. The crew used wedges to reseat the boilers. On 6 August, the weather worsened further and the wedges holding the boilers in place began to give way. Leaks developed and the ship was stopped to make repairs. Thereafter it proceeded slowly during the night of 6–7 August with only one boiler lit. However, the leaks increased and despite the efforts of the crew and passengers trying to bail out the water, it began to take on more water due to leaks in the supply lines in the bottom. It was again stopped for repairs, during which time it began to roll heavily, its boilers broke loose and all connection pipes were washed away, rendering its engines ineffective. Its crew rigged its sails to try to use wind power, but the sails blew away.

On 7 August, while Jeddah drifted in the Indian Ocean off Socotra and Cape Guardafui, Captain Clark and most of the ship's officers and crew prepared to launch the lifeboats. Upon discovering this, the pilgrims, who until then were helping bail out water from the engine room, tried to prevent the crew from abandoning them. A fight ensued, resulting in a few of the crew falling overboard and drowning.

The officers escaped in the starboard lifeboat, leaving the pilgrims to their fate. The Board of Trade inquiry proceedings note that a scuffle began while the lifeboat was being launched; the passengers threw whatever they could onto the lifeboat to prevent it from being lowered, and pulled away the first mate, who was lowering the boat from the ship, causing him to fall overboard. The first mate was later pulled into the lifeboat. Thus, the captain, his wife, the chief engineer, the first officer and several other crew members escaped in the lifeboat, leaving the passengers and a few of the officers and crew on their own aboard Jeddah. The British convict ship SS Scindian picked up the people in the lifeboat a few hours later at 10:00 a.m. on 8 August and took them to Aden, where they told a story of violent passengers murdering two of the ship's engineers and reported that Jeddah had sunk near Yemen with great loss of life among its passengers.

However, Jeddah did not sink. Its passengers later reported that after the captain's lifeboat had been launched, the second mate had tried to escape in another lifeboat along with a few passengers. The other passengers had prevented this, and in the confusion that ensued, the lifeboat fell into the water, drowning the second mate and two passengers aboard the lifeboat with him. Thereafter the remaining 20 crew members, including two officers, with the help of the passengers, bailed the water out of the ship's engine room. They then hoisted distress signals, which the Blue Funnel Line steamship SS Antenor (1872), sailing from Shanghai to London with 680 passengers aboard, sighted while Jeddah′s passengers and crew were trying to beach Jeddah off Ras Feeluk, near Bandar Maryah. Antenor approached Jeddah, assisted Jeddah′s crew and passengers in making her stable, and then towed her into the port of Aden, where she arrived on 11 August to much astonishment. Almost all the pilgrims had survived.

== Fate of crew and passengers ==
In all, the official inquiry established the number of people rescued from Jeddah as 18 crew members (one of whom was working his passage), one second engineer, one supercargo, and 992 passengers (778 men, 147 women, and 67 children, not counting infants in arms). In all, 18 people died during the incident, including the second mate, three Khalasis, and 14 passengers.

== Court of inquiry ==
A court of inquiry was held at Aden by the resident and sessions judge G. R. Goodfellow. The inquiry criticised Jeddah′s chief engineer for incorrect operation of the boilers, which aggravated matters. It also found the actions of Captain Clark in swinging out Jeddah′s lifeboats prematurely and subsequently launching the boats – dismaying the passengers – unprofessional and that he showed a "want of judgement and tact". It also found him "guilty of gross misconduct in being indirectly the cause of the deaths of the second mate and ten natives, seven crew and three passengers, and in abandoning his disabled ship with nearly 1,000 souls on board to their fate". His master's certificate was suspended for three years. The court of inquiry also criticised the behaviour of the Chief Mate Williams. It commended the actions of the master and first mate of Antenor. The court was also critical that 1,000 passengers could be allowed aboard a ship such as this during inclement weather.

== Aftermath and Joseph Conrad's book Lord Jim ==
The incident was much publicised in the United Kingdom in general and London in particular. Newspapers had many reports and letters to the editors, from the public, from people who had actually sailed on pilgrim ships and described the grim conditions aboard, and from merchants and owners of pilgrim ships.

The Jeddah incident inspired Joseph Conrad, who had landed in Singapore during 1883, to write the novel Lord Jim. He used the name SS Patna for his fictional pilgrim ship.

== See also ==
- Augustine Podmore Williams
- Costa Concordia disaster, the captain of which was accused of abandoning a wrecked ship
- SS Sirio
