= Ras Feeluk =

Ras Feeluk Ras Feelook
- Promontory
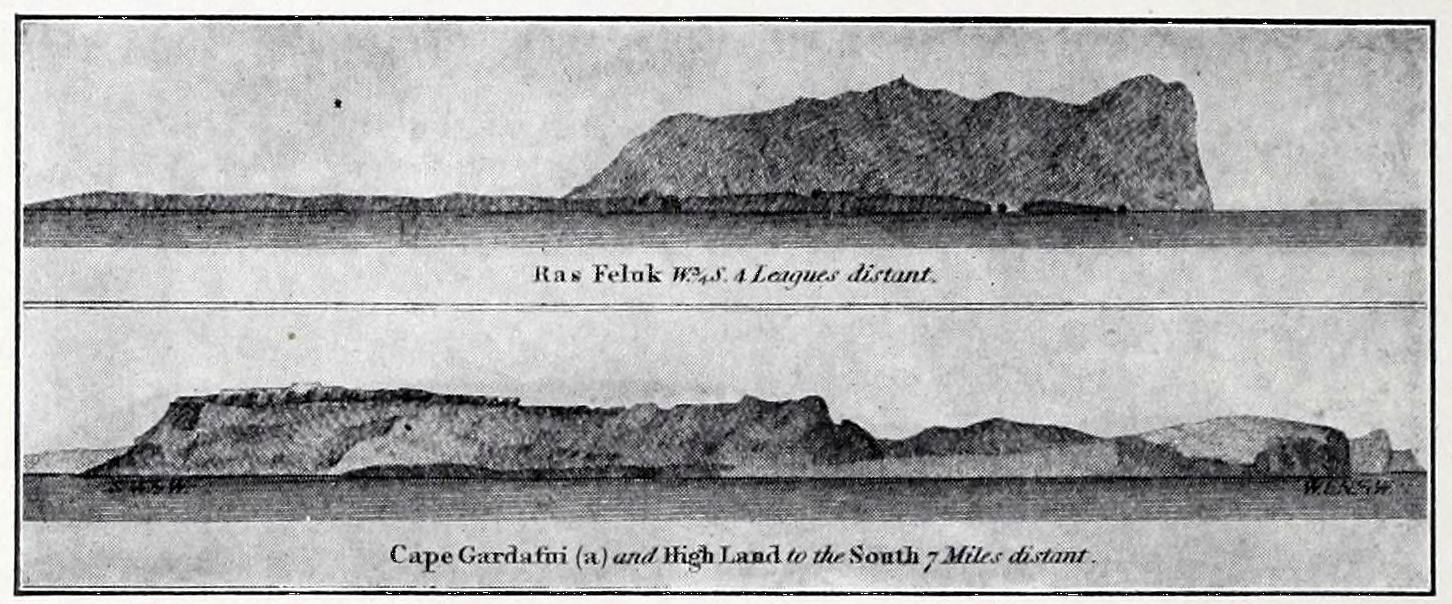
- Ras Feeluk along the coast of Africa near Socotra
- Location: Ra'as Aseir, Puntland

Dimensions
  - Length: 1,100 m (3,600 ft)

Ras Feeluk is a promontory in northeastern Somalia. It is located near the island of Socotra. It is close to Alula, Somalia, where the river Wady Afkaliya enters the sea.

== See also ==
- Ras Hafun
- SS Jeddah
