= Lord Jim =

1900 novel by Joseph Conrad

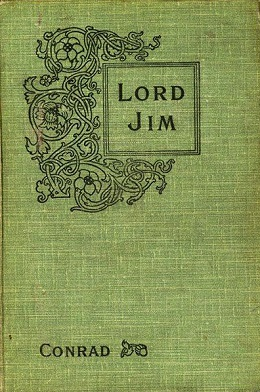
- First UK book edition (publ. William Blackwood & Sons)
- Author: Joseph Conrad
- Language: English
- Genre: Psychological novel Modernism
- Publisher: Blackwood's Magazine
- Publication date: 1900
- Publication place: Britain
- OCLC: 4326282

Lord Jim is a novel by Joseph Conrad originally published as a serial in Blackwood's Magazine from October 1899 to November 1900. An early and primary event in the story is the abandonment of a passenger ship in distress by its crew, including a young British seaman named Jim. He is publicly censured for this action and the novel follows his later attempts at coming to terms with himself and his past and seeking redemption and acceptance.

In 1998 the Modern Library ranked Lord Jim 85th on its list of the 100 best English-language novels of the 20th century.

== Plot summary ==
Recovering from an injury, Jim seeks a position on the SS Patna, a steamer serving the transport of 800 "pilgrims of an exacting belief" to a port on the Red Sea. He is hired as first mate. After some days of smooth sailing, the ship hits something in the night and the bulkhead begins bulging under the waterline. Captain Gustav thinks the ship will quickly sink, and Jim agrees but wants to put the passengers on the few boats before that can happen. The captain and two other crewmen think only to save themselves, and prepare to lower a boat. The helmsmen remain, as no order has been given to do otherwise. In a crucial moment, Jim jumps into the boat with the captain. A few days later, they are picked up by an outbound steamer. When they reach port, they learn that the Patna and its passengers were brought in safely by a crew from a French navy ship. The captain's actions in abandoning both ship and passengers are against the code of the sea, and the crew is publicly vilified. When the other men leave town before the magistrate's court can be convened, Jim is the only crew member left to testify. All lose their certificates to sail. Brierly, a captain of perfect reputation who is on the panel of the court, inexplicably commits suicide days after the trial.

Captain Charles Marlow attends the trial and meets Jim, whose behaviour he condemns, but the young man intrigues him. Wracked with guilt, Jim confesses his shame to Marlow, who finds him a place to live in a friend's home. Jim is accepted there but leaves abruptly when an engineer who had also abandoned the ship appears to work at the house. Jim then finds work as a ship chandler's clerk in ports of the East Indies, always succeeding in the job then leaving abruptly when the memory of the Patna incident catches up with him. In Bangkok, he gets in a fistfight. Marlow realises that Jim needs a new situation, something that will take him far away from modern ports and keep him occupied so that he can finally forget his guilt. Marlow consults his friend Stein, who sees that Jim is a romantic and considers his situation. Stein offers Jim to be his trade representative or factor in Patusan, a village on a remote island shut off from most commerce, which Jim finds to be exactly what he needs.

After his initial challenge of entering the settlement of native Malay and Bugis people, Jim manages to earn their respect by relieving them of the depredations of the bandit Sherif Ali and protecting them from the corrupt local Malay chief, Rajah Tunku Allang. He builds a solid link with Doramin, the Bugis friend of Stein, and his son Dain Waris. For his leadership, the people call him "Tuan Jim", or Lord Jim. Jim also wins the love of Jewel, a young woman of mixed race, and is "satisfied... nearly." Marlow visits Patusan once, two years after Jim arrived there, and sees his success. Jewel does not believe that Jim will stay, as her father left her mother, and she is not reassured that Marlow or any other outsider will not arrive to take him from her. Her mother had been married before her death to Cornelius, previously given the factor's role by Stein for her benefit. Cornelius is a lazy, jealous, and brutal man who treats his stepdaughter cruelly and steals the supplies Stein sends for sale; he is displaced by Jim's arrival and resents him for it.

"Gentleman" Brown, a marauding captain notorious for his evil ways, then sails into Patusan, his small crew on the brink of starvation. The local defence led by Dain Waris manages to prevent the marauders from looting the village and holds them entrenched in place while Jim is away in the island's interior. When Jim returns and Brown deceptively wins Jim's mercy, Jim hesitantly negotiates to allow them to leave Patusan unobstructed, but reminds Brown that the long passage down river to the sea will be guarded by armed men. Cornelius sees his chance to get rid of Jim. He tells Brown of a side channel that will bypass most of the defences, which Brown navigates, stopping briefly to ambush the defenders he finds out of revenge. Dain Waris is killed, among others, and Brown sails on, leaving Cornelius behind. Jim's man Tamb' Itam kills Cornelius for his betrayal. Jim is mortified when he receives word of the death of his good friend Waris. He resigns himself to his earlier commitment that no villagers would be harmed and chooses not to flee. Jewel, who had wanted Jim to attack Brown and his ship, is distraught and begs him to defend himself and never leave her. Jim then goes directly to Doramin and in front of the village takes responsibility for the death of his only son. Devastated, Doramin uses his flintlock pistols, given him by Stein, to execute Jim by shooting him in the chest.

On his regular route, Marlow arrives at Stein's house a few days after this event, finding Jewel and Tamb' Itam there, and tries to make sense of what happened. Jewel stays under the protection of Stein, who presages his own death.

== Characters ==
- Marlow: A sea captain in the Merchant Navy who helps Jim after his fall from grace, trying to understand how "one of us" could lack the bravery and judgment expected of seamen. Marlow is also the narrator of three of Conrad's other works: Heart of Darkness, Youth, and Chance.
- Jim: Young parson's son who takes to the sea, training for the merchant service as steam ships mix with sailing ships. He dreams of heroic deeds. He is a strong, tall, blond Englishman whose life is the story told by Marlow.
- Captain Gustav: Captain of the Patna, an Australian born in Germany, who is interested in the money made from this ship, with no concern for his honour as a captain. He is a man of huge girth. He orders the engineers to free a boat for them to leave the ship. After learning ashore that the ship came in ahead of them, he knows his certificate will be cancelled and he leaves, never seen again.
- Ship's engineers: Three men who keep the steam boiler working; one is George, who dies of a heart attack on the Patna as the others leave the ship. Another shows up later by chance at the same place where Jim is living, driving Jim away. The third becomes completely drunk, left in the hospital.
- Montague Brierly: Captain in the merchant service with a perfect reputation. He sits in the court that hears the case of the Patna crew, telling Marlow that Jim ought to hide somewhere, as he can never work as a seaman again. A few days after the trial, this superior man ("indeed, had you been Emperor of East and West, you could not have ignored your inferiority in his presence", Chapter 6) kills himself by jumping off his ship at sea, leaving no explanation.
- Stein: Head of Stein & Co., friend of Marlow, and a man with a long, interesting life. He has had success in trade in the East, collecting produce from various ports in the Dutch colonial areas and settling far from his native Bavaria after losing in the uprisings of 1848. He learned lepidopterology, which became his passionate hobby, gaining him a reputation for all the specimens he sent to contacts in Europe in this age of scientific discovery. He was married and had a child, both lost to him by disease. He understands Jim's temperament instantly.
- Jewel: Daughter of a Dutch-Malay woman and a white European man, never named, who deserted them. Her stepfather is Cornelius. Her mother died a year or two before she meets Jim.
- Cornelius: Former factor for Stein & Co., on account of his wife, whom Stein admired. He is a lazy man of no morals, and brutal. He is Malacca Portuguese. When replaced by Jim, he does not leave the area, nor does he find any useful occupation for himself. He connives with the marauder Brown to kill Jim, succeeding indirectly after Brown's men kill Dain Waris. Cornelius is killed by Tamb' Itam, who sees him after the attack and realizes the role he played.
- De Jongh: Friend to Marlow, and the last of the ship's chandlers who accepts Jim on Marlow's recommendation.
- Doramin: Old chief of the Bugis people in Patusan and father of Dain Waris, his only son. He was a friend to Stein, and the two exchanged gifts on parting: Doramin gave a ring to Stein, and Stein gave pistols to Doramin. He becomes an ally to Jim.
- Dain Waris: The only son of Doramin; a young, strong, and fiercely devoted leader of his people. He becomes fast friends with Jim.
- Sherif Ali: Local bandit who is a trial to all others in Patusan, extorting fees and stealing crops and resources from others. He is defeated by Jim, but not killed.
- Rajah Tunku Allang: Malay chief in Patusan who took Jim prisoner on his first entry into the country. Jim escapes, starting life there on his own terms.
- Tamb' Itam: Malay servant and loyal bodyguard to Jim.
- Gentleman Brown: A cruel captain of a latter-day pirate crew, who kills because he can, and is not a success in life. He has a ship in poor condition and a crew of men similar to him when he runs short of food near Patusan. He goes up the river to the village, which successfully forces him to retreat to a nearby hilltop. On leaving, Brown orders a vengeful attack on Patusan's defenders, killing Dain Waris, which leads to the end of Jim's life. Marlow meets an ailing Brown in Bangkok just before his death, and hears the story of the encounter from Brown's viewpoint.

== Allusions to historical events ==
The opening event in Lord Jim has been speculated by historians to have been based in part on an actual abandonment of a ship. On 17 July 1880 the British merchantman SS Jeddah set sail from Singapore bound for Penang and Jeddah, with 778 men, 147 women, and 67 children on board. The passengers were Muslims from the Malay states and were travelling to Mecca for the hajj (holy pilgrimage). After rough weather conditions, the Jeddah began taking on water. The hull sprang a large leak, the water rose rapidly, and the captain and officers abandoned the heavily listing ship. They were picked up by another vessel and taken to Aden, where they claimed that the passengers had attacked two engineers and the ship had foundered in poor weather. The pilgrims were abandoned by the crew. However, on 8 August 1880, a French steamship towed Jeddah into Aden and the pilgrims on board survived the incident. An official inquiry followed, as in the novel.

The inspiration for the character of Jim was the chief mate of the Jeddah, "Austin" Podmore Williams, whose grave was tracked down to Singapore's Bidadari Cemetery by Gavin Young in his book In Search of Conrad. As in the novel, Williams created a new life for himself, returning to Singapore and becoming a successful ship's chandler.

Conrad may also have been influenced by the naturalist Alfred Russel Wallace's 1869 account of his travels and of the native peoples of the islands of Southeast Asia, The Malay Archipelago; the character Stein is based on Wallace. The second part of the novel is based in some part on the life of James Brooke, the first Rajah of Sarawak – as Conrad himself says in his letter to Margaret Brooke: "The book (Lord Jim) which has found favour in your eyes has been inspired in great measure by the history of the first Rajah's enterprise...". Brooke was an Indian-born English adventurer who in the 1840s managed to gain power and set up an independent state in Sarawak, on the island of Borneo. Some critics, however, think that the fictional Patusan was intended not to be part of Borneo but of Sumatra.

== Recognition ==
In 1998 the Modern Library Board ranked Lord Jim 85th on its list of the 100 best English-language novels of the 20th century. In 1999, the French newspaper Le Monde conducted a contest among readers to rank which of 200 novels of the 20th century they remembered best. Seventeen thousand responses yielded the final list, which placed Lord Jim at number 75. The complete list is found in Le Monde's 100 Books of the Century in English, and also in French Wikipedia.

== Critical interpretation ==
The novel is in two main parts, firstly Jim's lapse aboard the Patna and his consequent fall, and secondly an adventure story about Jim's rise and the tale's climax in the fictional town of Patusan, presumed a part of the Indonesian archipelago. The main themes surround young Jim's potential ("he was one of us", says Marlow, the narrator) thus sharpening the drama and tragedy of his fall, his subsequent struggle to redeem himself, and Conrad's further hints that personal character flaws will almost certainly emerge given an appropriate catalyst. Conrad, speaking through his character Stein, called Jim a romantic figure, and indeed Lord Jim is arguably Conrad's most romantic novel.

In addition to the lyricism of Conrad's descriptive writing, the novel is noted for its sophisticated structure. The bulk of the novel is told in the form of a story recited by the character Marlow to a group of listeners, and the conclusion is presented in the form of a letter from Marlow. Within Marlow's narration, other characters also tell their own stories in nested dialogue. Thus, events in the novel are described from several viewpoints, and often out of chronological order.

The reader is left to form an impression of Jim's interior psychological state from these multiple external points of view. Some critics (using deconstruction) contend that this is impossible and that Jim must forever remain an enigma, whereas others argue that there is an absolute reality the reader can perceive and that Jim's actions may be ethically judged.

There is also an analysis that shows in the novel a fixed pattern of meaning and an implicit unity that Conrad said the novel has. As he wrote to his publisher four days after completing Lord Jim, it is "the development of one situation, only one really, from beginning to end." A metaphysical question pervades the novel and helps unify it: whether the "destructive element" that is the "spirit" of the Universe has intention—and, beyond that, malevolent intention—toward any particular individual or is, instead, indiscriminate, impartial, and indifferent. Depending (as a corollary) on the answer to that question is the degree to which the particular individual can be judged responsible for what he does or does not do; and various responses to the question or its corollary are provided by the several characters and voices in the novel.

The omniscient narrator of the first part remarks of the trial: "They wanted facts. Facts! They demanded facts from him, as if facts could explain anything!" Ultimately, Jim remains mysterious, as seen through a mist: "that mist in which he loomed interesting if not very big, with floating outlines – a straggler yearning inconsolably for his humble place in the ranks... It is when we try to grapple with another man's intimate need that we perceive how incomprehensible, wavering, and misty are the beings that share with us the sight of the stars and the warmth of the sun." It is only through Marlow's recitation that Jim lives for us – the relationship between the two men incites Marlow to "tell you the story, to try to hand over to you, as it were, its very existence, its reality – the truth disclosed in a moment of illusion."

Postcolonial interpretations of the novel, while not as intensive as that of Heart of Darkness, point to similar themes in the two novels – the protagonist sees himself as part of a "civilising mission" and the story involves a "heroic adventure" during the apogee of the New Imperialism era. "There are clear parallels between the Patusan section of Lord Jim and Heart of Darkness: both Jim and Kurtz are resourceful white Europeans ruling over indigenous people in a sort of Hegelian master-slave dialectic, in linguistic, geo- graphic, social, and cultural isolation." Conrad's use of a protagonist with a dubious history has been interpreted as an expression of his increasing doubts with regard to positive benefits of colonialism; literary critic Elleke Boehmer sees the novel, along with Dr. Jekyll and Mr. Hyde, as part of a growing suspicion that "a primitive and demoralising other" is present within the governing order of the day. However, seen "in contrast to Kurtz’s bestiary modernism, Jim’s dream of living the romantic life of light-seafaring literature in a modern industrial age is redeeming and sobering".

== Comics adaptations ==
George Evans adapted the novel into a comic book in the 1950s.

== Radio adaptations ==
The book has been adapted in 6 parts for BBC Radio:

- Lord Jim (1985), directed by Keith Darville.

== Film adaptations ==
The book has twice been adapted into film:

- Lord Jim (1925), directed by Victor Fleming.
- Lord Jim (1965), directed by Richard Brooks and starring Peter O'Toole as Jim.

The 1979 Hindi film Kaala Patthar has strong traces of Lord Jim, with Amitabh Bachchan playing the role of an ex-Merchant Navy captain who struggles to overcome his guilt of having abandoned a ship and risked the lives of passengers, and turns into a coal-mine worker.

== Allusions and references to Lord Jim in other works ==
- Jim's ill-fated ship, the Patna, is also mentioned in Jorge Luis Borges' short story "The Immortal", and Lord Jim himself is referenced in Borges' "The Other Death".
- The Disney motion picture, Spooner, used the story of Lord Jim as a shadow and point of comparison for the dilemmas faced by the movie's main character, Harry Spooner/Michael Norlan (played by Robert Urich).
- Lord Jim is referenced in the final section of Herman Wouk's 1951 novel The Caine Mutiny as the captain of the Caine struggles to come to terms with his own decision to abandon ship.
- Lord Jim is the name of a boat, and subsequently the nickname of the boat's owner, Richard Blake, in Penelope Fitzgerald's 1979 Booker Prize-winning novel Offshore.
- Lord Jim is referenced in the song "Conrad" by English singer-songwriter Ben Howard: "You were the boat that bridged / In the tale of Conrad / We will never be the change / To the weather and the sea and you knew that."
- In the Mexican film Amor Libre, directed by Jaime Humberto Hermosillo, the lead characters July (Alma Muriel) and Julia (Julissa) are reading the book. July read the first half, and Julie the second.
- In the French film Volontaire by Hélène Fillières (2018), the figure of Laure Baer (played by Diane Rouxel) finds the book in her superior's desk and reads it.
- Polish composer Romuald Twardowski wrote an opera of the story in 1973.
- In the second season of Good Omens, Aziraphale takes inspiration from a copy of Lord Jim on his bookshelf when he needs to give a false name for the archangel Gabriel in hiding.
