= Charles Knyvett of Hamerton =

English surveyor

Charles Knyvett of Hamerton (c. 1480 – before 22 October 1528) was a member of the noble Knyvett family, the second son of Sir William Knyvett and his second wife Lady Joan Stafford, daughter of Humphrey Stafford, 1st Duke of Buckingham and Anne Neville, Duchess of Buckingham.

== Buckingham's surveyor ==
Knyvett was employed as surveyor to his cousin Edward Stafford, 3rd Duke of Buckingham, responsible for managing the Duke's estates in Kent. Knyvett was dismissed from his position in 1520, and shortly after was a witness at Buckingham's trial, holding that Buckingham had been responsible for "wrongfully withholding the goods" of his sister Elizabeth (d. 1518).

== Family ==
The identity of Knyvett's first wife is unclear, but by her he had a son and a daughter:

1. Robert Knyvett (1511–1549), married Anne Tollemache. Robert was killed in action in Kett's Rebellion.
2. Elizabeth Knyvett, married Richard Fitzwilliam, son of Sherriff of London Sir William Fitzwilliam

Knyvett remarried Anne Lacy by settlement dated 26 April 1513 or 1514, and by her had a further three sons and three daughters:

1. Richard Knyvett (d. 1559), married Helen Harding, daughter of William Harding of London and Knowle Park, Cranleigh, Surrey (d. 7 September 1549) and Cecily Marshe, the daughter of Walter Marshe of London. They had two children.
2. Anthony Knyvett (d. 1554), a participant in Wyatt's rebellion, for which he was executed at Sevenoaks, Kent.
3. William Knyvett (d. 1554), another member of Wyatt's rebellion, executed with his brother at Sevenoaks.
4. Lucy Knyvett, married Sir Henry Gates
5. Anne Knyvett, married firstly Nicholas Robinson, secondly Leonard Irby and thirdly Robert Carr
6. Alice Knyvett, married Edward Verney, grandson of Edmund Braye, 1st Baron Braye

== In culture ==
Knyvett was the model for Buckingham's Surveyor, a minor character in William Shakespeare and John Fletcher's history play Henry VIII (1613).
