= White Rush =

- Directed by: Mark L. Lester
- Written by: C. Courtney Joyner
- Produced by: Donn Aron; Martin J. Barab; Joseph DePompeii; Dana Dubovsky; Peter Jay Klauser; Mark L. Lester; Judd Nelson; Art Okun; Ric Gallaher
- Starring: Judd Nelson
- Cinematography: Ken Blakey
- Edited by: Donn Aron
- Music by: Dana Kaproff
- Distributed by: Canon Films Corp.
- Release date: 2003
- Running time: 87 min.
- Country: United States
- Language: English

White Rush is a 2003 film directed by Mark L. Lester and starring Judd Nelson. The plot concerns a group of young tourist couples who come across a drug deal gone bad.

== Premise ==
A group of young tourist couples comes across a drug deal gone bad while on vacation.

== Cast ==
- Judd Nelson as Brian Nathanson
- Tricia Helfer as Eva
- Sandra Vidal as Solange
- Deborah Zoe as Arlene Gelb
- Taylor Sheridan as Tug, Douglas
- Santino Ramos as Gang Member
- Louis Mandylor as Chick

== Production ==
Filming took place in Salt Lake City, Utah.
