= Patusan =

Fictional country in Lord Jim by Joseph Conrad

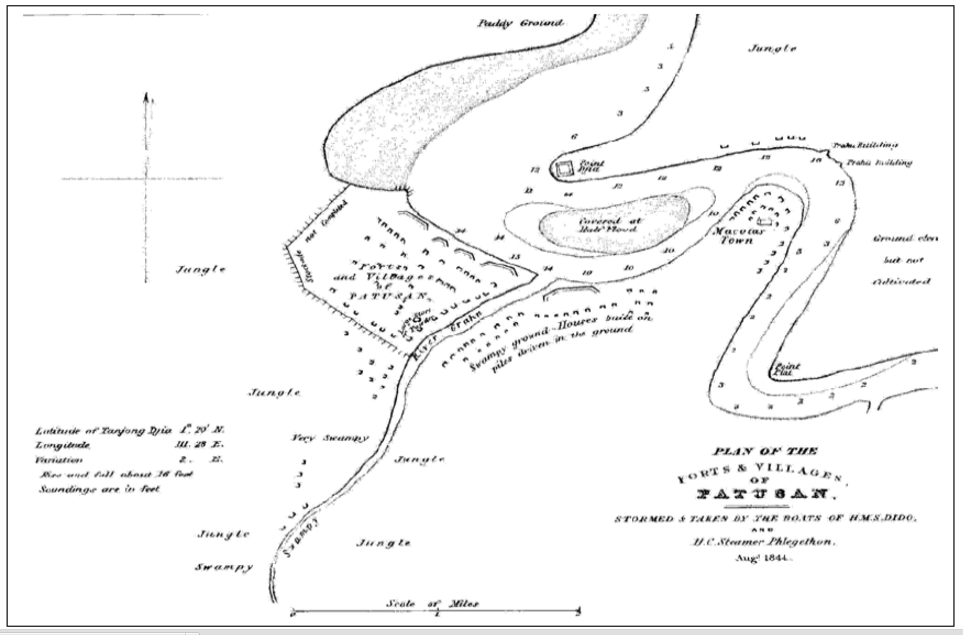
A map of the forts and villages of Patusan which appears in Henry Keppel's account of The Expedition to Borneo of HMS. Dido for the Suppression of Piracy (1846)

Patusan is a fictional country originating in the novel Lord Jim by Joseph Conrad, published in 1900. It has subsequently appeared in various films and television shows.

In Conrad's novel, the country is a remote backwater in the South Seas, forgotten by the rest of the world and essentially without contact with outside civilization. Prior to Jim's arrival, it is ruled by various factions of native people, whom Conrad refers to as "Malays".

== Geography, settlements, and government ==
Conrad writes that the main access of the country to the outside world was via a river through jungle to the coast. The novel mentions two main settlements: the first being in the interior of the country at the intersection of the river and a muddy stream. This was in the vicinity of two high, steep hills situated close together, separated by a yawning chasm. The second settlement was a small fishing village on the coast at the mouth of the river.

Conrad makes clear that the country, though officially ruled by the petty, melodramatic Rajah Tunku Allang, was effectively dominated by several groups of people prior to the arrival of Jim. These groups included a brigand group led by Sherif Ali in a stockade at the top of one hill, and a community of Bugis, led by their large, quiet, stately chief Doramin.

== Basis in reality ==
While Conrad, a well-traveled individual who had led an adventurous seafaring life, intended the country to be a fictional place, the essential character of Patusan certainly has some basis in reality and in European perceptions of the East Indies around the turn of the 20th century. A theory exists that in Conrad's mind, Patusan was essentially Berau, the Indonesian part of Borneo, which is a place he visited.

The Oxford Reader's Companion to Conrad claims that Patusan was a genuine pirate settlement in Sarawak. Some critics, however, think that the fictional Patusan is to be found not in Borneo but in Sumatra. In Chapter 38 of Lord Jim, "Brown related to [the narrator] in detail their passage down the Straits of Macassar", then "shot the schooner across the Java Sea", and finally "after clearing the Sunda Straits" anchored off the mouth of the river running through Patusan - seemingly pointing to a location in Sumatra.

== Interpretation ==
Literary criticism of Lord Jim includes interpretations of Patusan's symbolic meanings. It has been described as a particularly enclosed space that traps its inhabitants, echoing literary tropes of Gothic castles and their associated themes.

== Films ==
A country called Patusan has appeared in the movies The Last Electric Knight, Surf Ninjas, Sidekicks. The Last Electric Knight and its spinoff TV series Sidekicks revolve around one Ernie Lee, a native of Patusan, played by Ernie Reyes Jr. In Surf Ninjas, a plucky young hero, also played by Ernie Reyes Jr., leads a successful revolution against an authoritarian, played by Leslie Nielsen, and brings freedom to Patusan. This Patusan, like Conrad's Patusan, is a small island nation in the neighborhood of Indonesia, inhabited by Malay people and forgotten by the rest of the world. The island is depicted on a map when they travel to it from California. It seems to be located just east of Vietnam.

== See also ==
- List of fictional countries
