= Ruby Lopez =

American television host and model

Ruby Lopez is an American television host and model.

In 2007, she reported for Comcast SportsNet's new Motorsports show, "Zero to 60", where she interviewed and raced with some of the top drivers. In Fall 2007 Ruby Lopez became the new reporter on "49ers Total Access".

Lopez works as an Associate Producer on two national children's shows.

She was also the winner of the 2003 Miss Latina USA pageant. Ruby then went on to represent the United States in the Miss Latina World Pageant.

She was a contestant in MTV's Final Fu
