= Augustine Podmore Williams =

English mariner

- Born: 22 May 1852; Porthleven, Cornwall, England
- Died: 17 April 1916 (aged 63); Shamrock, Barker Road, Singapore, Straits Settlements
- Burial place: Bidadari Cemetery (former)
- Other names: Austin Williams; Augustus Podmore Williams; Daddy
- Occupations: Water Clerk, former mariner
- Employer(s): McAlister & Co. Dawood & Co.
- Spouse: Elizabeth Jane Robinson (m. 1883–1916)
- Children: 16

Augustine Podmore Williams (22 May 1852 – 17 April 1916) was an English mariner who gained notoriety in the 1880s as the result of a scandal on the high seas.

== Biography ==
Austin Williams was born in Porthleven, Cornwall, the son of a country parson. He was a merchant mariner. In July 1880, the 28-year-old Williams was serving as chief mate aboard the Jeddah, a boat owned by the Singaporean merchant Syed Mohamed Alsagoff. The boat was captained by Joseph Clark, who set sail from Singapore on 18 July 1880. The ship stopped at Penang and took on board more than 950 Muslim pilgrims, all making their way to Arabia in order to perform the hajj in Mecca. The ship's destination was the Red Sea port of Jeddah.

On 3 August, the ship found itself in the middle of a fierce hurricane which gradually grew in intensity. As the Jeddah began to take on water, the officers lost nerve and Captain Clark, spurred on by his chief mate Williams, decided to abandon ship in a boat which would only take on himself, his wife and a few of the officers and passengers. As there were nowhere near enough boats for the pilgrims, they would have to fend for themselves. The pilgrims found this out, and the officers only managed to abandon ship and launch their boat with great difficulty in the middle of the night. They assumed that the ship would founder. However, the next day, the storm died down and the skies cleared. The deserting officers had been rescued by another vessel (the Scindia), and Captain Clark had reported the Jeddah lost in the high seas. Meanwhile, the Jeddah was towed to Aden port by the steamship ''Antenor''.

When the true story became known, the scandal made news throughout the nautical world. The case was discussed extensively and written about in the contemporary press in Singapore, Britain and elsewhere. An inquiry found Captain Clark guilty of gross misconduct and his captain's certificate was suspended for three years. Austin Williams, on the other hand, was seen to be a key instigator of the desertion and faced the opprobrium of the entire shipping community. He left the sea soon after the trial. He became a water-clerk with the Singaporean ship chandlers McAlister & Co., for whom he worked for the next 27 years.

Williams married a Eurasian girl from Singapore by the name of Elizabeth Jane Robinson on 22 January 1883 in St Andrew's Cathedral. They had sixteen children, seven of whom died before their father.

Eventually, he went into business on his own, but met with scant success. Williams later joined the firm Dawood & Co. While on duty on 15 March 1916, he slipped and fell, fracturing a hip bone. He failed to recover from this injury, and died of complications a month later, on 17 April 1916, at his residence at Shamrock, 32 Barker Road, and was interred at the Bidadari Cemetery in northeast Singapore.

== Legacy ==
Williams's story served as the inspiration for Joseph Conrad's novel Lord Jim. Conrad, who was himself an experienced sailor, had spent time in Singapore in the 1880s and had come across Williams as a result.

A century later, the author Gavin Young tracked down the few remaining traces of Williams in Singapore, including his long-forgotten grave in Bidadari, in the course of researching In Search of Conrad, a book of travel and literary detection. When the dead of Bidadari Cemetery were exhumed in the early 2000s in order to make way for redevelopment plans, Williams's granddaughter, Queenie, a daughter of his youngest son, Cuthbert, reclaimed his remains.

Joseph Conrad based his novel Lord Jim on the story of the Jeddah and the character of Austin Williams.
