= Henry Gates (MP) =

16th-century English politician

Sir Henry Gates (c. 1515 – 7 April 1589), of Seamer, Yorkshire; Kilburn, Middlesex; Kew, Surrey and Havering, Essex, was an English courtier, politician, and diplomat.

Gates was a younger son of Geoffrey Gates of High Easter, Essex, and the brother of John Gates.

== Life ==
Gates became a Member of Parliament (MP) of the Parliament of England for New Shoreham in 1545, Bridport in 1547 and Bramber in 1549.

Gates was appointed a Gentleman of the Privy Chamber under King Edward VI by June 1551, a position he held until the king's death in 1553. He was knighted by the Lord Protector in 1547.

Gates acquired a number of public offices, such as comptroller of petty customs for London (1551–53) and receiver-general of the Duchy of Cornwall (1552–53). With his brother, he supported the bid in 1553 to put Lady Jane Grey on the English throne, and the two were arrested, sent to the tower, and found guilty of treason. His brother was executed, but Henry was eventually pardoned, but with the loss of all his offices. He moved to live in Seamer, near Scarborough in the North Riding of Yorkshire, and began a new life in the north of England.

After Queen Elizabeth I acceded to the throne in 1558, Gates was able to acquire the positions of Custos Rotulorum of the North Riding of Yorkshire by 1562 and Vice-Admiral of Yorkshire by 1565, serving in the latter role until 1573.

Gates renewed his parliamentary career with his election for Yorkshire in 1571 and 1586, and Scarborough in 1563 and 1572.

== Rising of the North ==
Gates was Captain of Scarborough Castle and Vice-Admiral of Yorkshire. As a response to the Rising of the North in 1569, Gates commissioned a ship, the Ellinor of Saltash, to patrol the coast. With Thomas Gargrave, Humphrey Barwick, and Marmaduke Constable, leading around 600 troops, he took Hartlepool from the rebel leader Christopher Neville.

Gates went to Scotland with William Drury, instructed to request the rendition of the rebel Earl of Northumberland and other fugitives. They met Regent Moray in the Great Hall of Stirling Castle on 19 January 1570, and had a discussion in his bedchamber after dinner. Ralph Sadler paid Gates £50 for the expenses of this journey. Moray was assassinated three days later in Linlithgow.

== Death ==
Gates died on 7 April 1589. He married twice, first to Lucy, the daughter of Charles Knyvett, of Hamerton, with whom he had 4 sons and 4 daughters; and second Katherine, the daughter of Watkin Vaughan of Bredwardine, Herefordshire and the widow of James Boyle of Hereford. His son Edward also became an MP.
