= SS Patna =

Fictional ship

SS Patna is a fictional ship in the novel Lord Jim by Joseph Conrad, originally published in Blackwood's Magazine from October 1899 to November 1900. Though never confirmed by the author, the ship is based on the real ship SS Jeddah. The fictional Patna used steam and sail in combination.

There was also a real three-master rebuild to use steam and sail in combination, the steamship named SS Patna built by William Denny and Brothers, Dumbarton, and launched on 21 April 1871. She was a single-screw passenger ship owned by British India Steam Navigation Company Glasgow & London and scrapped at Bombay in 1901. 1764 tons gross. Length: 298 feet, beam: 33 feet. Whether or not Joseph Conrad partially based his fictional Patna on this ship is unknown. The fact that he had a merchant-marine career in France and 15 years in Great Britain means that probably he heard of or even had seen the real SS Patna.

At least two groups of White Fathers (second and fourth caravan from Zanzibar) have travelled on the real SS Patna from Algiers to Aden on their way to Zanzibar, on the way to the later Heart of Darkness. In the second caravan there was Adolphe Loosveldt, a former pontifical zouave. His correspondence was published in 2010. Loosveldt mentioned the name Patna in June 1879 in three letters; in his letter of 25 June 1879, he mentioned that the steamship Patna was a three-master with a length of 120 m. In the fourth caravan there was the Flemish White Father Amaat Vyncke, also former pontifical zouave, on his way to Kibanga who was on board the Patna from 23 April 1883 to 10 May 1883. In his letter of 24 April 1883 he mentioned that the second caravan of White Fathers had also been on the same ship. There is no doubt about being this ship because in the same letter, Father Vyncke mentioned it was a three-master and steamer length of 300 feet with capacity of 1800 tons - company: British India Company.

== Allusions and references from other works ==
The Patna, is also mentioned in Jorge Luis Borges' short story "The Immortal." In the Alien 3 novelization by Alan Dean Foster, the "rescue" ship that Bishop II arrives in is called the Patna.
