= Lord Jim (1925 film) =

1925 film

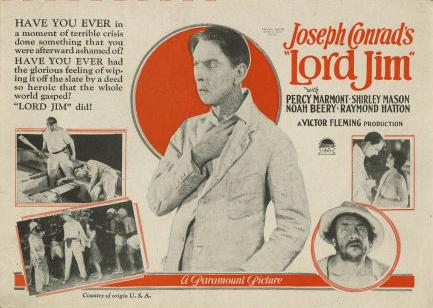
- Theatrical poster
- Directed by: Victor Fleming
- Written by: Screenplay: George C. Hull; John Russell
- Based on: Lord Jim; 1900 novel by Joseph Conrad
- Starring: Percy Marmont; Shirley Mason; Noah Beery
- Cinematography: Faxon M. Dean
- Distributed by: Paramount Pictures
- Release date: November 15, 1925
- Running time: 70 minutes
- Country: United States
- Language: Silent (English intertitles)

Lord Jim is a 1925 American silent drama film starring Percy Marmont (in the title role), Noah Beery, and Duke Kahanamoku. The film was directed by Victor Fleming and based on the 1900 novel Lord Jim by Joseph Conrad.

== Plot ==
As described in a review in a film magazine, Jim is a seaman who joins a cowardly captain and his stenchful crew in deserting a boatload of Muslim pilgrims on their way to Mecca. He is hypnotized into turning his back on his duty, but hypnotism is no alibi in an Admiralty Court and he loses his mate's certificate. The stigma follows him until an understanding merchant sends him to a remote Malay settlement, where he grows in power until he shares authority with the son of the Rajah. The captain and his crew, likewise blacklisted, have turned pirates and are led to the settlement by the former factor at the settlement, whom Jim has kept on through a fellow feeling of pity until he has become impossible. The same pity for the under dog leads him to turn the pirates loose, and they repay his generous act by killing the son of the Rajah. Jim pays with his own life for the loss of the Rajah's son.

== Cast ==
- Percy Marmont as Lord Jim
- Shirley Mason as Jewel
- Noah Beery as Captain Brown
- Raymond Hatton as Cornelius
- Joseph Dowling as Stein
- George Magrill as Dain Waris
- Nick De Ruiz as Sultan
- J. Gunnis Davis as Scoggins
- Jules Cowles as Yankee Joe
- Duke Kahanamoku as Tamb Itam
- Ernie Adams as Patna Seaman (uncredited)
- Joseph W. Girard as Courtroom Spectator (uncredited)
- William Henry as Street Urchin (uncredited)
- Chris-Pin Martin as One of Brown's Crewmen (uncredited)
- Lew Meehan as Sailor Who Kicks Dog (uncredited)
- Evelyn Selbie as Sultan's Wife (uncredited)
- Harry Tenbrook as Sailor Who Goes for Water (uncredited)

== Preservation ==
A print of Lord Jim is preserved at the Library of Congress and the UCLA Film and Television Archive.
