= Ernie Reyes Sr. =

American martial artist, actor, and fight choreographer

- Born: February 12, 1947 (age 79)
- Education: San Jose State University
- Occupations: Actor; martial artist; fight choreographer
- Relatives: Ernie Reyes Jr. (son)

Ernesto E. Reyes Sr. (born February 12, 1947) is an American martial artist, actor and fight choreographer who is the co-founder and head instructor of West Coast World Martial Arts, where he has been teaching for more than 35 years. He is the father of five, including fellow actors Ernie Jr. (born Ernesto E. III) and Lee Reyes.

== Biography ==
Ernie Reyes is the son of Filipino immigrants Ernesto Sr. and Valentina Reyes, who came to California in the 1920s. He grew up in Salinas, California and started working in the fields when he was 12 years old. He majored in business administration at San Jose State University, where he met Tony Thompson. In 1966 he began studying martial arts with Tang Soo Do, continuing through his years at San Jose State. He then studied Tae Kwon Do. By the early 70s, he was studying other martial arts, including Boxing, Kickboxing, Escrima, knife and Wu Shu. In the mid-1970s, he competed in karate. He won the US National Tae Kwon Do championship in 1977, followed by a bronze at the 1977 World Taekwondo Championships.

Reyes co-founded the West Coast World Martial Arts Association with Tony Thompson. The association has more than 35 schools, teaching more than seven thousand students. He has led and choreographed the demonstration team from the association, blending modern music and gymnastics with traditional martial arts. The demonstration team has been entertaining and demonstrating martial arts since the early 1980s.

In 2021, Reyes was inducted into the International Sports Hall of Fame.

== Film ==
Ernie Reyes choreographed the martial arts for the films Surf Ninjas and The Last Dragon. During the filming of a fight for The Last Dragon, one of the stuntmen was injured. Even though he was new to the film industry, Ernie Reyes recommended to the director that only martial artists who were familiar with working together should be fighting each other on screen. The director agreed, removing some of the other stunt men and letting Ernie's black belts take over. Ernie Reyes also choreographed the martial arts for the TV show Sidekicks, using his own West Coast black belts for the fight scenes with his son. He had a role on screen in Surf Ninjas and Secret Bodyguard. Though he did not appear in the film, Reyes portrayed Akuma in the arcade and console ports of the 1994 live-action adaptation of Street Fighter.

== Family ==
Ernie Reyes has five children: Ernie Jr., Lee, Destiny, Espirit and Ki.
