= Sidekicks (TV series) =

- Genre: Action; Adventure; Martial arts
- Written by: Jeremy Lew; Steve Stoliar
- Directed by: James Fargo
- Starring: Ernie Reyes Jr. Gil Gerard; Nancy Stafford; Keye Luke
- Theme music composer: Rare View
- Country of origin: United States
- No. of episodes: 23

Production
- Editor: Bille Brame
- Running time: 30 min
- Production companies: Motown Productions; Walt Disney Television

Original release
- Network: The Disney Channel; ABC
- Release: September 26, 1986 – June 13, 1987

Sidekicks is a martial arts television series, a spin-off of the Walt Disney 1986 special, The Last Electric Knight. The series starred Ernie Reyes Jr. as Ernie Lee, the Last Electric Knight, and Gil Gerard as Sergeant Jake Rizzo. The pilot movie premiered on February 16, 1986, as part of The Disney Sunday Movie, and was rebroadcast under the title Sidekicks on September 19, 1986. The weekly series debuted on September 26, 1986, airing as part of ABC's Friday night primetime lineup at 9 pm. After Life with Lucy was cancelled, Sidekicks moved to Saturdays at 8 pm.

== Synopsis ==
Sergeant Jake Rizzo (Gil Gerard) is chosen by Sabasan as tutor of his grandson Ernie Lee (Ernie Reyes, Jr.), the last heir of an ancient clan of special martial artists and a highly trained karate fighter. Rizzo becomes Ernie's foster father.

Ernie often finds himself in dangerous situations, such as when bullies at school or toughs on the streets of Los Angeles threaten him or his friends. Other times, his adoptive father needs help when criminals which he has captured try to escape or try to harm him. With Ernie's quick moves, unique powerful skills and the clever advice of his deceased grandfather, he overcomes these difficulties and triumphs.

== Characters ==
- Ernie Lee (Ernie Reyes Jr.) – the Last Electric Knight and the main character of the series; an adept in martial arts
- Sergeant Jake Rizzo (Gil Gerard) – Ernie's adoptive father; a police officer
- Patricia Blake (Nancy Stafford) – Ernie's social worker and Rizzo's love interest
- Sabasan (Keye Luke) – Ernie's deceased grandfather, who appears through the series in short flashbacks. As Ernie is faced with new dilemmas in each episode, he often meditates in order to reach the appropriate solution. In a similar fashion to Luke's role as Master Po in the 1970s TV series Kung Fu, Ernie recalls advice previously given to him by Sabasan which helps him in the present.
- Capt. Blanks (Vinny Argiro) – commanding officer at Rizzo's police station
- Det. R.T. Mooney (Frank Bonner) – Sgt. Rizzo's partner

== Episode list ==
=== TV movie ===
Title	Directed by	Written by	Original release date
"The Last Electric Knight"	James Fargo	Dan Gordon	February 16, 1986

=== Season 1 ===
No.	Title	Directed by	Written by	Original air date
1	"Are These Your Kicks?"	Allen Reisner	Richard Chapman & Bill Dial	September 26, 1986
2	"Open House"	Kim Manners	Steve Stoliar	October 3, 1986
3	"I Hate the Neighbors"	Allen Reisner	Bob Comfort	October 17, 1986
4	"My Dad the Crook"	Vincent McEveety	W. Reed Moran	October 24, 1986
5	"Down and Out in Van Nuys"	Vincent McEveety	Elia Katz	October 31, 1986
6	"Thrill of the Chase"	Ric Rondell	Bob Comfort	November 7, 1986
7	"Catherine the Not-So-Great"	Helaine Head	John Kostmayer	November 14, 1986
8	"My Dad's Bigger Than Yours"	Nick Havinga	Chris Miller & Michael Sutton	November 22, 1986
9	"The Birds and the Killer Bees"	Linda Day	W. Reed Moran	November 29, 1986
10	"I Remember Mama, But Does She Remember Me?"	Kim Manners	Richard Chapman & Bill Dial	December 13, 1986
11	"Grey Belts"	Sig Neufeld	Gary Rosen	December 20, 1986
12	"The Cousin Who Fell to Earth"	Victor Lobl	Casey Kelly	January 3, 1987
13	"The Boy Who Saw Too Much"	Allen Reisner	W. Reed Moran	January 10, 1987
14	"Just for Kicks"	Sigmund Neufeld Jr.	David Peckinpah	January 17, 1987
15	"Kicked Upstairs"	Judy Vogelsang	Richard Chapman & Bill Dial	January 31, 1987
16	"An Eye for an Ear"	Ric Rondell	Richard Chapman & Bill Dial	February 7, 1987
17	"The Next Best Thing to Winning"	Allen Reisner	Mike Piller	February 14, 1987
18	"The Patusani Always Rings Twice"	Ric Rondell	W Reed Moran	February 21, 1987
19	"Petty Cache"	Jay Broad	Steve Stoliar	February 28, 1987
20	"The Worst of the Mohicans"	Allen Reisner	Gary Rosen	March 7, 1987
21	"Playing for Keeps"	Kim Manners	Thomas Perry & Jo Perry	June 6, 1987
22	"Read Between the Lines"	Gil Gerard	Bill Luetscher	June 13, 1987

== Alternative titles ==
- Le Chevalier Lumière (French title)
- ילד הקראטה (Yeled Ha-Karate) (Israeli title, translated: The Karate Kid)
- El Karateca eléctrico (Latin American title)
- Compañeros (Spanish title)
- El Pequeño Karateca (Argentinian, Chilean, Colombian and Venezuelan title)
- O Pequeno Mestre (Brazilian title)
- 태권소년 어니 (Korean title)
- 功夫小子 (Gongfu Xiaozi) (Chinese title)
- Az utolsó(elektromos)lovag (Hungarian title)
- Partnerzy (Polish title, translated: Partners)
- Partnerid (Estonian title, translated: Partners)

== Series ownership ==
DePasse Entertainment as successor to Motown Productions and Disney-ABC Domestic Television as a successor to Walt Disney Television currently own series rights.
