= Ernie Reyes Jr. =

American actor and martial artist (born 1972)

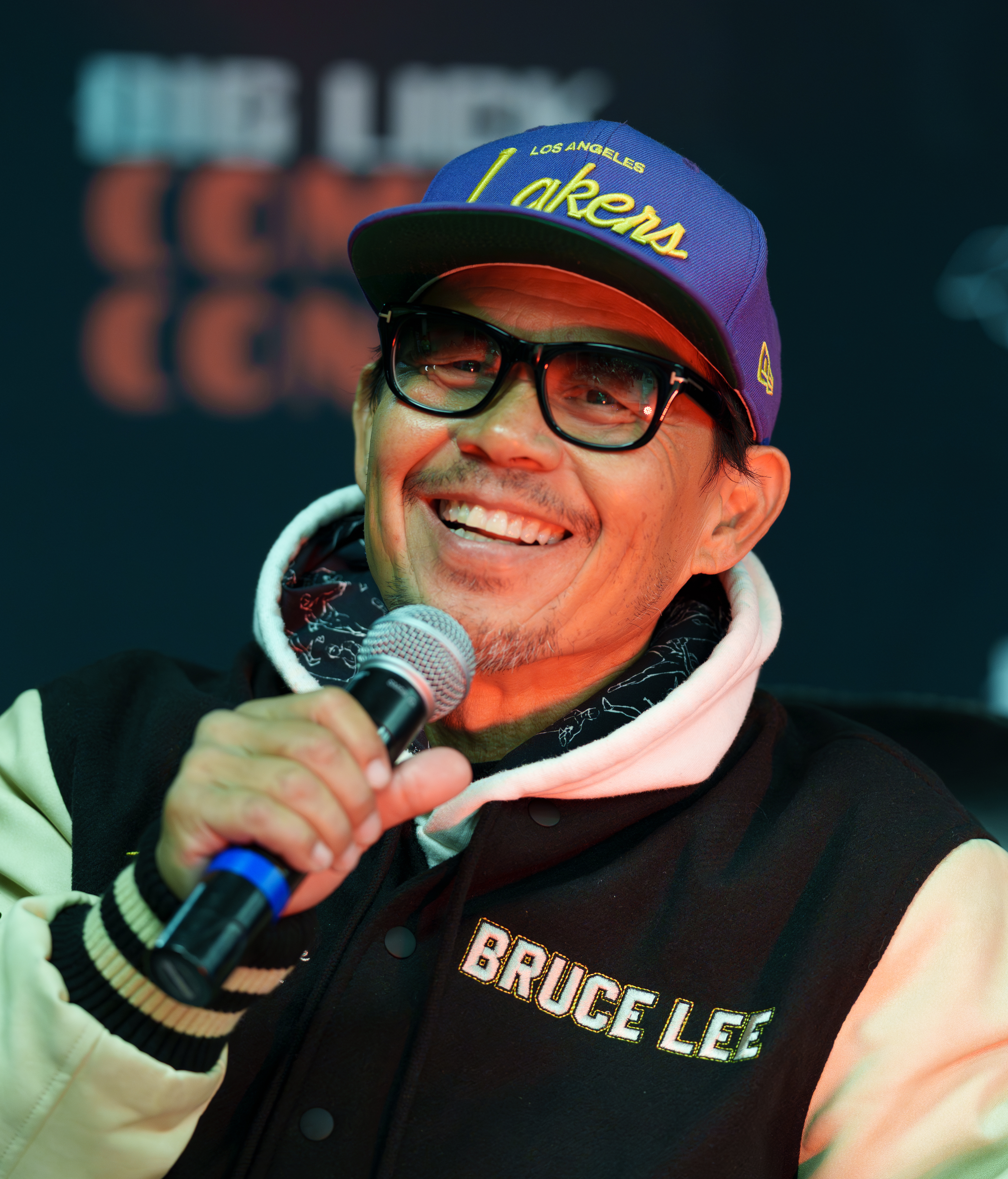
- Reyes Jr. at Big Lick Comic Con in Roanoke, Virginia in 2026
- Born: Ernie E. Reyes Jr. January 15, 1972 (age 54); San Jose, California, U.S.
- Occupations: Actor; martial artist; stuntman
- Years active: 1985–present
- Martial arts career
- Height: 5' 5''
- Weight: 132 lb (60 kg; 9 st 6 lb)
- Division: Bantamweight
- Style: Muay Thai, kickboxing, taekwondo
- Fighting out of: San Jose, California
- Trainer: Ernie Reyes, Sr.
- Years active: 1998–2005 (kickboxing)

Kickboxing record
- Total: 3
- Wins: 3
- By knockout: 1

Ernie Reyes Jr. (born January 15, 1972) is an American actor, stuntman, martial artist, and former professional kickboxer. He is known for his roles in films such as The Last Dragon, Red Sonja (both 1985), as Donatello's fight double in Teenage Mutant Ninja Turtles (1990) and Teenage Mutant Ninja Turtles II: The Secret of the Ooze (1991), Surf Ninjas (1993) and The Rundown (2003).

Reyes has also done stunt work in films such as Indiana Jones and the Kingdom of the Crystal Skull, as well as motion capture stunts in films such as Avatar and Alice in Wonderland. His TV work includes season 3 episode 4 of Highway to Heaven, dramas such as the short-lived Sidekicks (in which he co-starred with Gil Gerard), and NCIS: Los Angeles and reality TV series such as Final Fu.

== Early life ==
A third-generation Filipino American, Reyes was born in San Jose, California in 1972. His father Ernie Reyes Sr. is a martial artist, actor, and stuntman. He has three brothers and two sisters, one of whom, Lee, is a boxer and another, Santino Ramos, is a filmmaker/artist.

== Career ==
By age 6, Reyes had joined his father's West Coast Demo Team. He made his film debut at age 13 in the 1985 film The Last Dragon. The same year he shared the screen with Arnold Schwarzenegger and Brigitte Nielsen in Red Sonja. During this time, he also had his own television series, Sidekicks, a spin-off of the original Walt Disney one-time special The Last Electric Knight, alongside Gil Gerard presented by Michael Eisner. He also appeared in an episode of the hit television series MacGyver in 1988. Reyes had starring roles in Surf Ninjas, and notably as Keno, the pizza delivery boy, in the second Teenage Mutant Ninja Turtles film, The Secret of the Ooze. He also served as the martial arts stunt double for Donatello in the first Ninja Turtles film. He later appeared in films such as Rush Hour 2 playing Zing and in The Rundown alongside WWE wrestler Dwayne "The Rock" Johnson. Reyes guest starred in three episodes of the TV series Kung Fu: The Legend Continues alongside David Carradine.

In 2006, Reyes hosted the MTV martial arts reality show Final Fu.

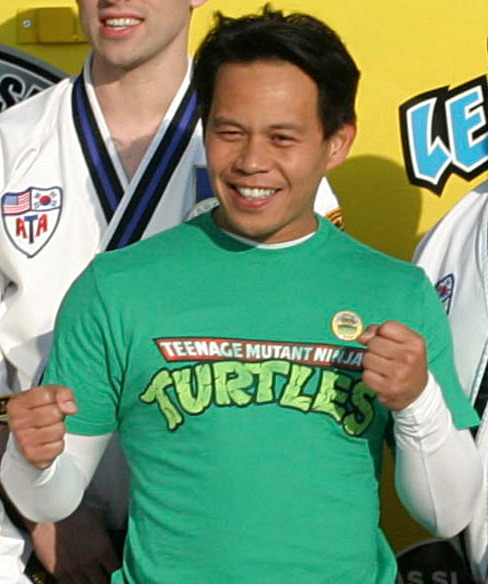
Reyes Jr. at a TMNT 25th anniversary event in 2009.

Reyes has done motion capture stunts for blockbuster films such as Avatar and Alice in Wonderland. He also played a cemetery warrior in Indiana Jones and the Kingdom of the Crystal Skull who gets killed by his own poison dart. Reyes guest starred on NCIS: Los Angeles "The Frozen Lake" and “Expiration Date” playing "Jay Thapa", a Nepalese soldier who is an expert in knife-fighting.

=== Kickboxing ===
Reyes has a professional fight record of 3–0 in Strikeforce which was a large mixed martial arts organization but started out as a Muay Thai and kickboxing organization.

Reyes fought Anthony Elkaim the WKA ISKA Champion.He knocked out the champion in the 3rd round. His next two fights would be won by decision, including a unanimous decision over Veasna Thach, which aired on ESPN. Reyes' fight against the champion Anthony Elkaim also aired on ESPN.

== Personal life ==
In June 2015, it was reported that Reyes was suffering from kidney failure and was in need of a transplant. According to his sister, Reyes undergoes dialysis three times per week for four hours each day. His family set up a GoFundMe campaign to help raise $75,000 for his medical expenses. In August 2022, Reyes revealed that the transplant had been successful and that he was healthy.

== Filmography ==
=== Film ===
Year	Title	Role	Notes
1985	The Last Dragon	Tai	
1985	Red Sonja	Prince Tarn	
1989	Ernie and Master Kim	Ernie	
1990	Teenage Mutant Ninja Turtles	Donatello	Fight/stunt double
1991	Teenage Mutant Ninja Turtles II: The Secret of the Ooze	Keno	
1993	Surf Ninjas	Johnny	Also assoc. producer and stunt performer
1995	White Wolves II: Legend of the Wild	Steve	
1996	Paper Dragons	Wu	
1996	Small Time	Marty	
1998	The Process	Jesse	Also director and writer
2000	Kill Shot	Koji	
2001	Rush Hour 2	Zing	
2002	Poolhall Junkies	Tang	
2003	The Rundown	Manito	
2007	Redline	Ernie	
2008	Indiana Jones and the Kingdom of the Crystal Skull	Cemetery Warrior	
2009	The Red Canvas	Johnny Sanchez	Also exec. producer
2009	Avatar	—N/a	Utility stunts
2010	Alice in Wonderland	Tweedledee	Stunt double
2011	Act of Valor	Recruit	Also stunt performer
2014	Ninja Apocalypse	Hiroshi	
2018	The Next Kill	Badass Blue-Shirt-Wearing Pizza-Loving Surfer Dude	
2018	Fury of the Fist and the Golden Fleece	Padawan	
2018	Uncharted Live Action Fan Film	El Tigre	Short film
2022	How I Got There	Rafael	
2024	The Featherweight	—N/a	Stunt coordinator

=== Television ===
Year	Title	Role	Notes
1986	Sidekicks	Ernie Lee	Main
1986	Highway to Heaven	Michael Clancy Nguyen	Episode: "Another Kind of War, Another Kind of Peace"
1988	MacGyver	Luke Chen	Episode: "Murderers' Sky"
1991	Secret Bodyguard	Ernie Rey	
1993	Kung Fu: The Legend Continues	Emperor Sing Ling	3 episodes
1996	F/X: The Series	Jimmy Chu	Episode: "Eye of the Dragon"
1999	V.I.P.	Sparring Partner	Episode: "Big Top Val"
2001	Secret of the Horse	Victor Tran	Television film
2002	Charmed	Kaz	Episode: "Witches in Tights'
2006	Final Fu	Himself (Host)	Main
2013–15	NCIS: Los Angeles	Jay Thapa	2 episodes: "The Frozen Lake" and "Expiration Date"
2017	The Librarians	Monkey King	Episode: "And the Fatal Separation"
2017	Dice	Cambodian Dice	Episode: "The Trial"
2017	Doubt	Judge Dickson Haggerty	2 episodes
2018	Brooklyn Nine-Nine	Bob #2	Episode: "The Negotiation"
2018–21	Superstore	Various roles	3 episodes

== Kickboxing record ==
Kickboxing record
3 Wins (1 KO), 0 Losses
Date	Result	Opponent	Event	Location	Method	Round	Time	Record
2005-10-00	Win	(United States) Ryan Fotheringham	Strikeforce	San Jose, California, US	Decision	5	3:00	3-0
1999-00-00	Win	(Cambodia) Veasna Thach	Strikeforce	San Jose, California, US	Decision (unanimous)	5	3:00	2-0
1998-00-00	Win	(France) Anthony Elkaim	Strikeforce	Milan, Italy	KO	3		1-0
Legend: Win Loss Draw/No contest Notes

== See also ==
- Patusan
