= David James Galloway =

British physician (1858-1943)

Sir David James Galloway
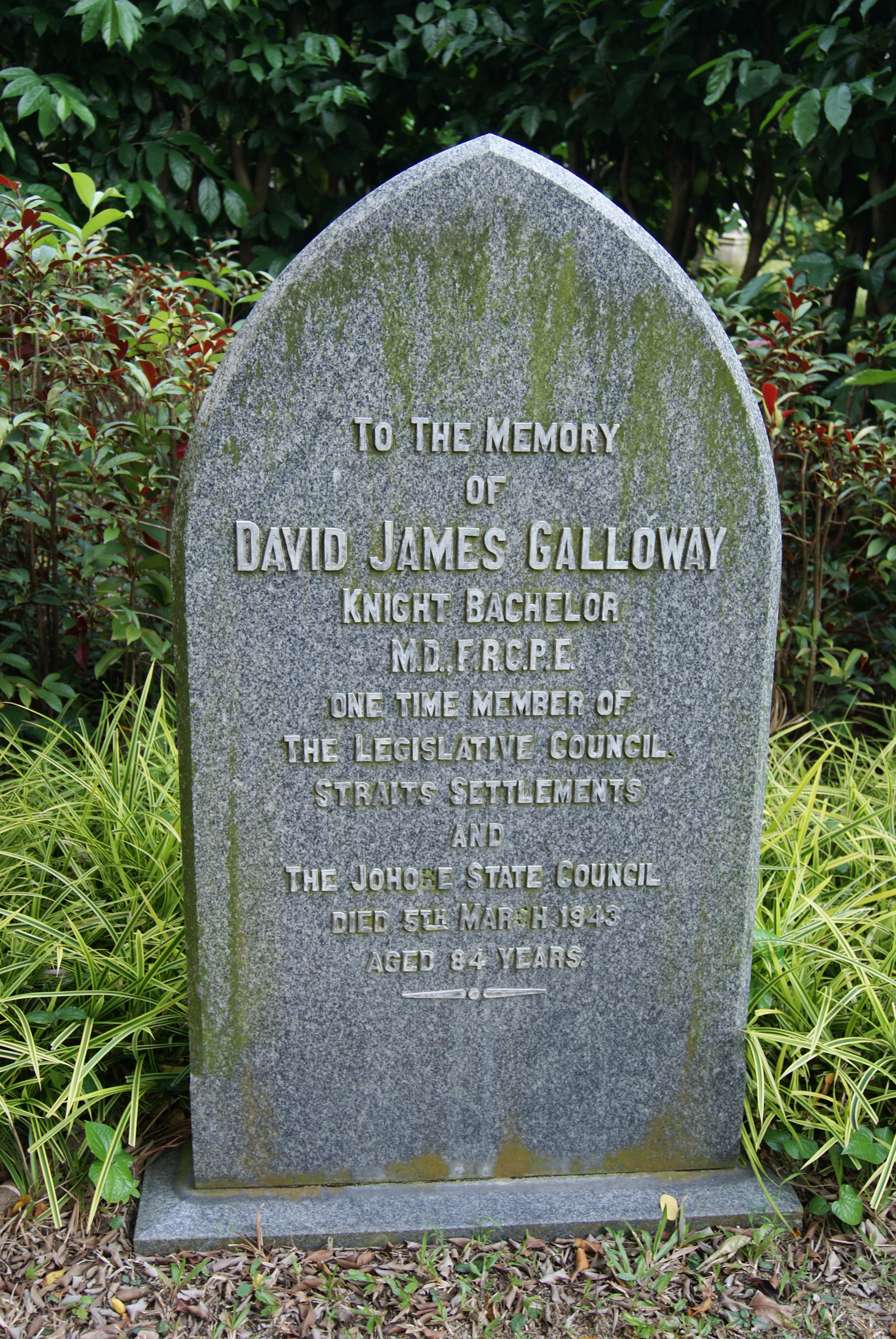
- Gravestone of Sir David James Galloway at Bidadari Garden, Singapore
- Born: 8 May 1858; Edinburgh, Scotland
- Died: 5 March 1943 (aged 84); Singapore
- Education: University of Edinburgh
- Occupation: Physician
- Years active: 1885 to 1931
- Children: 1 son and 1 daughter

Sir David James Galloway (8 May 1858 – 5 March 1943) was a British physician who served as a member of the Executive Councils of the Straits Settlements and Johore.

== Early life and education ==
Galloway was born on 8 May 1858 in Edinburgh, Scotland. He was educated at Daniel Stewart's College and University of Edinburgh where he received his Bachelor of Medicine. He became a member of the Royal College of Physicians, Edinburgh in 1899, Doctor of Medicine M.D. (Awarded Gold Medal by University of Edinburgh) in 1900, and Fellow of the Royal College of Physicians, London in 1902.

== Career ==
In 1885, Galloway proceeded to the Straits Settlements to practise as a doctor and arrived in Singapore on February 15. There he acquired the practice of a British doctor and soon built up a large clientele. Later, he became the medical adviser to the Johore royal family, and in 1895 accompanied family members to London to bring back the embalmed body of the Sultan of Johore. He was decorated with the Order of the Crown of Johore, 2nd class for service to the Sultan in 1896, which was promoted to 1st class in 1914.

Galloway was an unofficial Member of Executive Council of the Straits Settlements from 1903 to 1914, and again in 1921, but resigned when he was nominated to the Executive Council, being the first unofficial to occupy such position, where he served until 1929. He was also appointed to the Johore Executive Council. He taught in the Straits Settlements and Federated Malay States Government Medical Schools. He was Vice-Chairman of the Straits Opium Commission; President of the Royal Asiatic Society, Straits Branch; and Fellow of the Royal Society of Medicine. He was founder and president of Straits Medical Association, and founder of the British Medical Association, Malaya branch. He was made Grand Prior of the Order of the Hospital of St John in 1909. In 1924, he became the first doctor in Malaya to be knighted. He retired from practice in 1931.

== Publications ==
On Splenic Abscess of Malarial Origin, B.M.J., 1903; On the Etiology and Treatment of Sprue, Journal Tropical Medicine, 1905; On the Otomycosis of the Malay Archipelago, Journal of Otology, 1903. Numerous articles and reports on the public health of Singapore including: The Local Aspects of Tuberculosis, 1920, and Our Venereal Disease Problem, 1934.

== Personal life and death ==
Galloway married Rodney Mary Murray in 1886, and they had a son and a daughter. He died on 5 March 1943 and was buried at Bidadari Garden in Singapore, aged 84.

== Honours ==
Galloway was created a Knight Bachelor in the 1924 New Year Honours. He was awarded the Order of the Crown of Johore, 2nd class for service to the Sultan of Johore in 1896, promoted to 1st class in 1914.
