= Bidadari Garden =

Memorial garden in Bidadari, Singapore

- Bidadari Memorial Garden
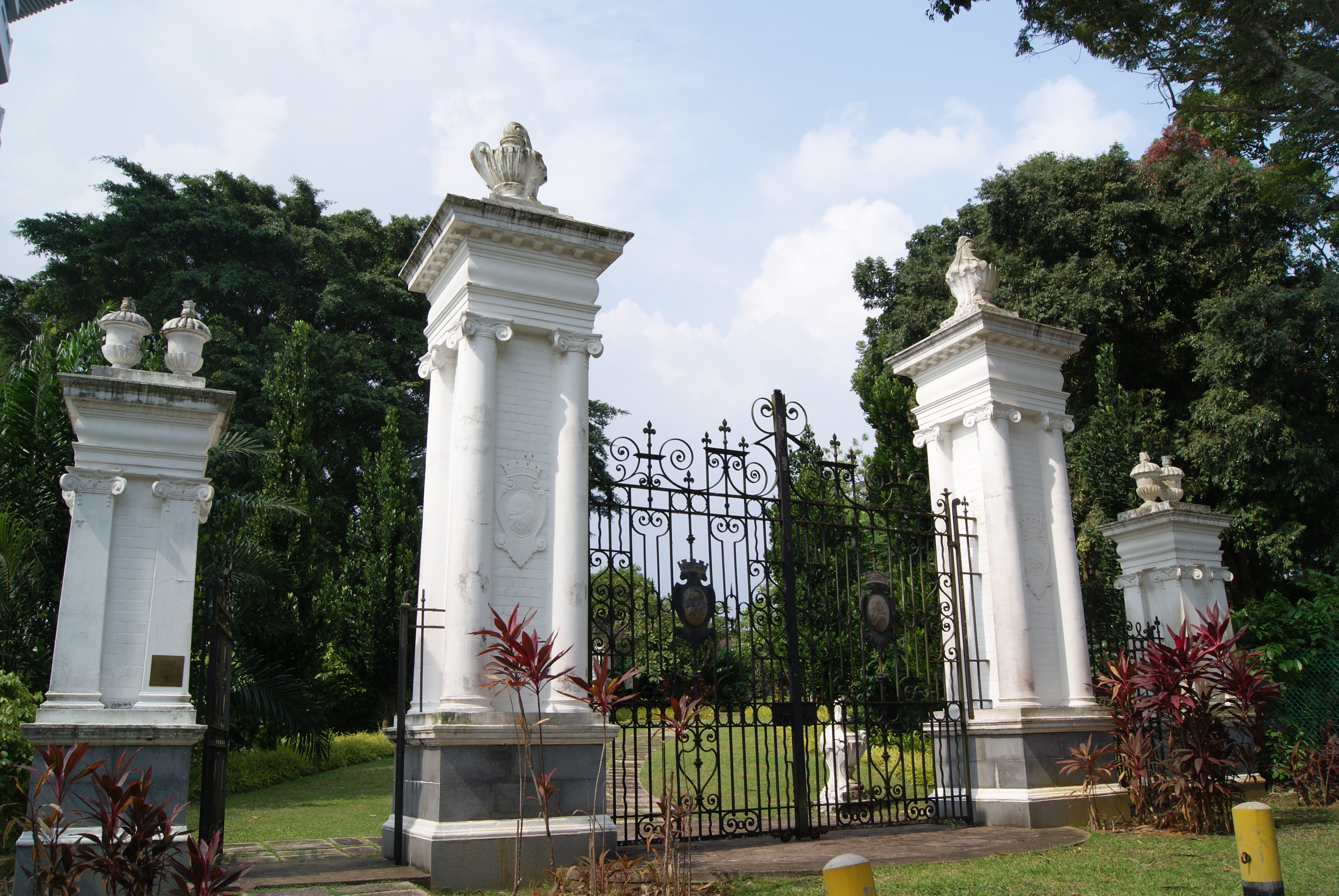
- The gate of the former Bidadari Cemetery, now located in Bidadari Garden at 10 Vernon Park, Singapore 367812.

- Location within Singapore
- Type: memorial garden
- Location: Bidadari, Singapore
- Coordinates: 1°20′22.9″N 103°52′36.7″E
- Established: 2004
- Opened: 2004
- Closed: 10 June 2019
- Administrator: National Heritage Board
- Operator: National Heritage Board
- Status: Removed

The Bidadari Garden (also known as Bidadari Memorial Garden) was a memorial garden once located along Veron Road in Bidadari, Singapore.

== History ==
The site was once part of the Hindu section of the Bidadari Cemetery before exhumations took place from 2001 to 2006. During the exhuming process of the cemetery, a memorial park known as the Bidadari Garden was established on this site by the National Heritage Board in 2004 to commemorate the history of the Bidadari Cemetery.

The former gates and gateposts from the former Bidadari Cemetery were moved to this memorial garden and formed its entrance. 21 of the selected headstones from the former cemetery were also relocated there. The memorial garden comprised various sections to represent the Christian, Muslim and Hindu sections of the old cemetery.

In August 2013, the Housing and Development Board announced plans for the future Bidadari housing estate and worked closely with National Heritage Board and National Parks Board to relocate and integrate the memorial garden with the Bidadari Park. The memorial garden eventually closed on 10 June 2019 to make way for further development.

== Gallery ==
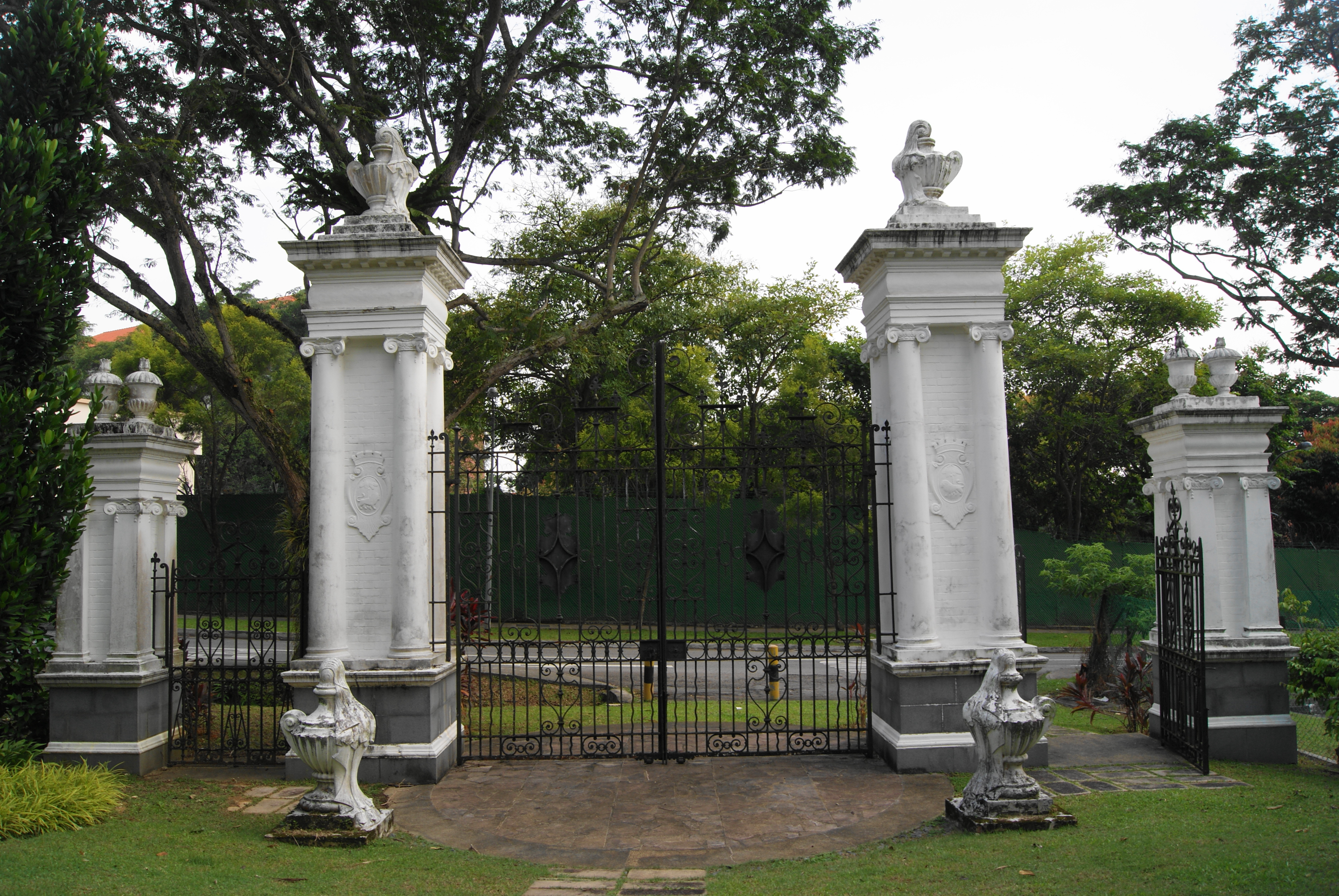
The gate of the former Bidadari Cemetery, currently located at Bidadari Garden

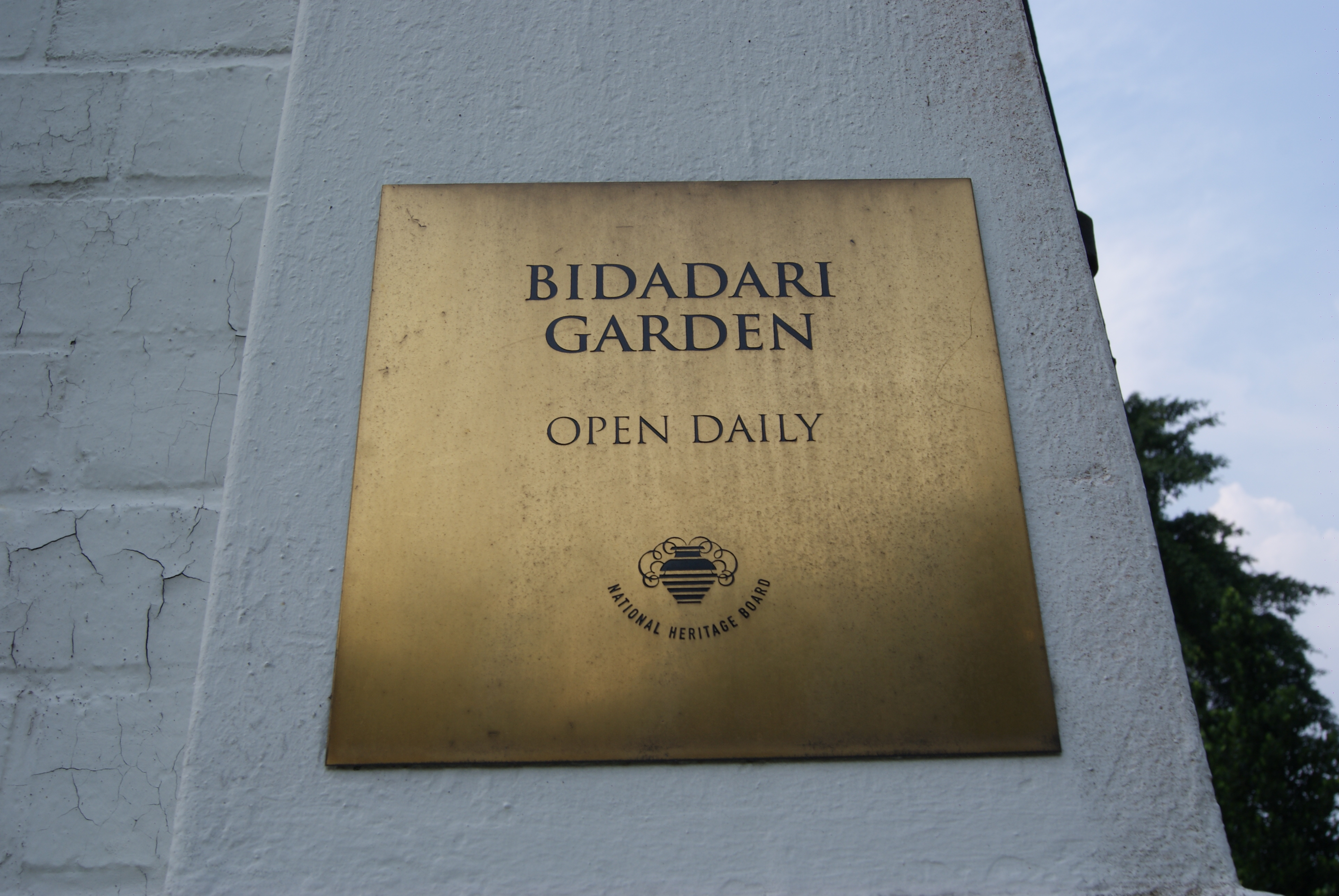
Bidadari Garden sign

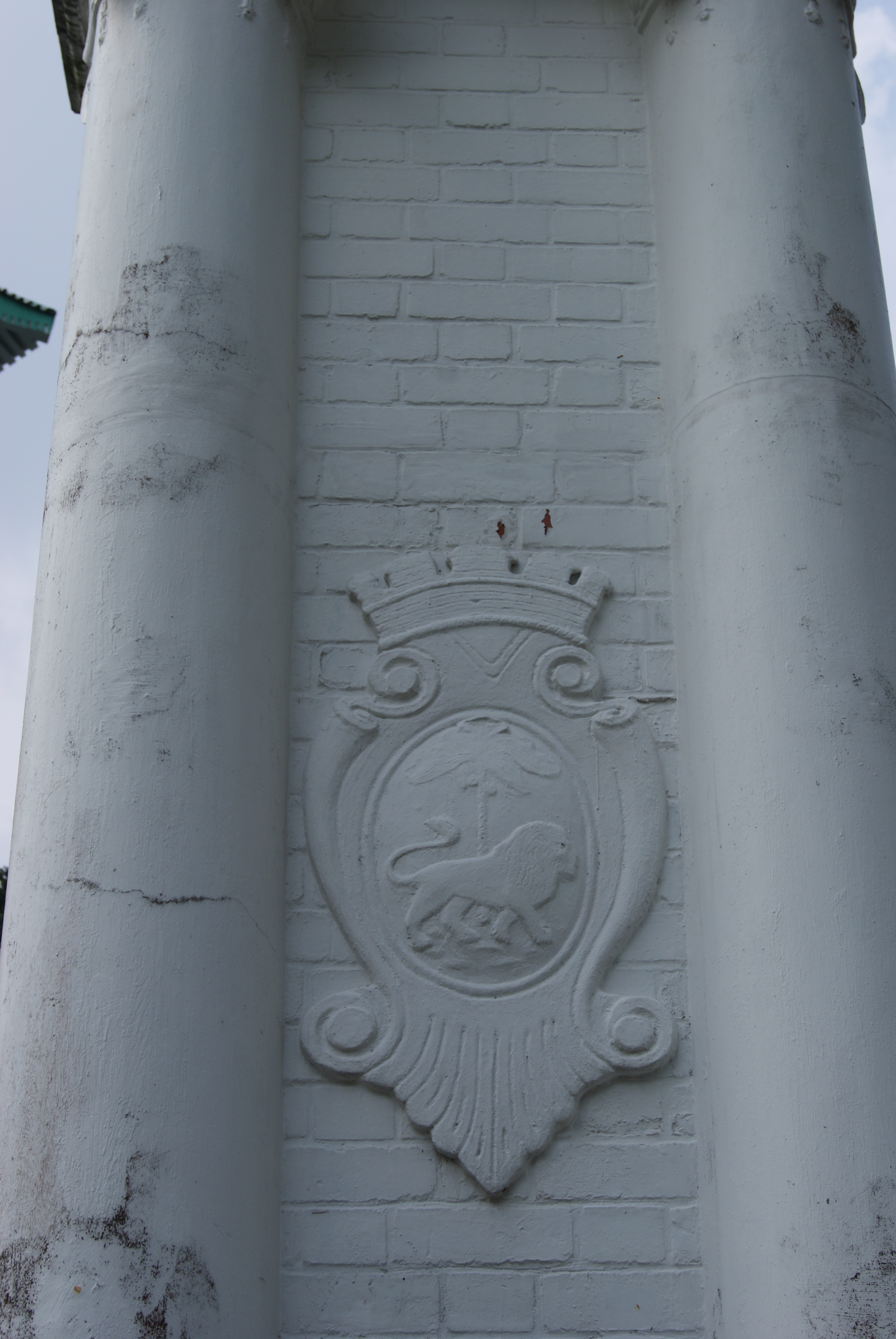
Crest of the Singapore Municipal Commission on a gatepost of the former Bidadari Cemetery

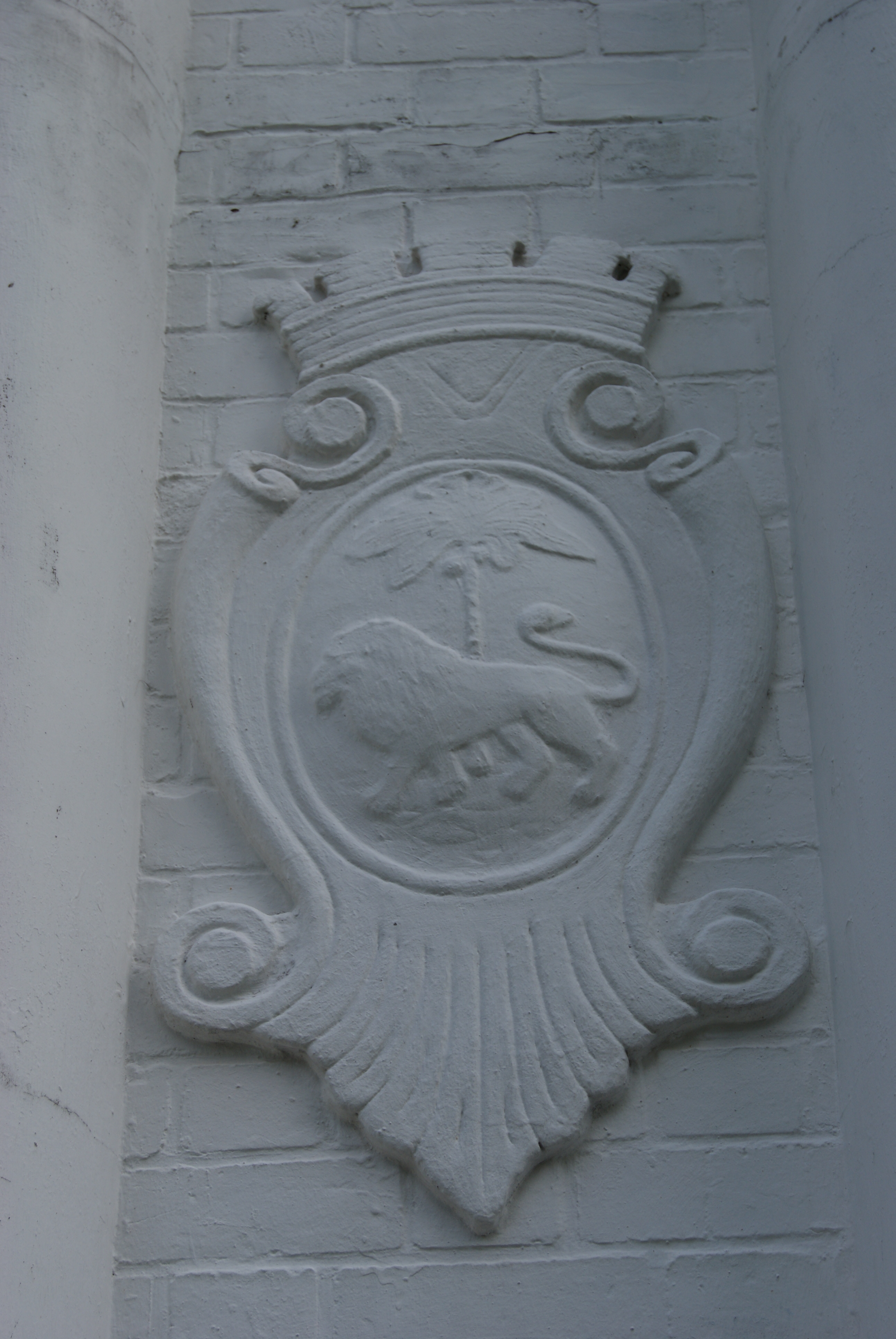
Crest of the Singapore Municipal Commission on a gatepost of the former Bidadari Cemetery

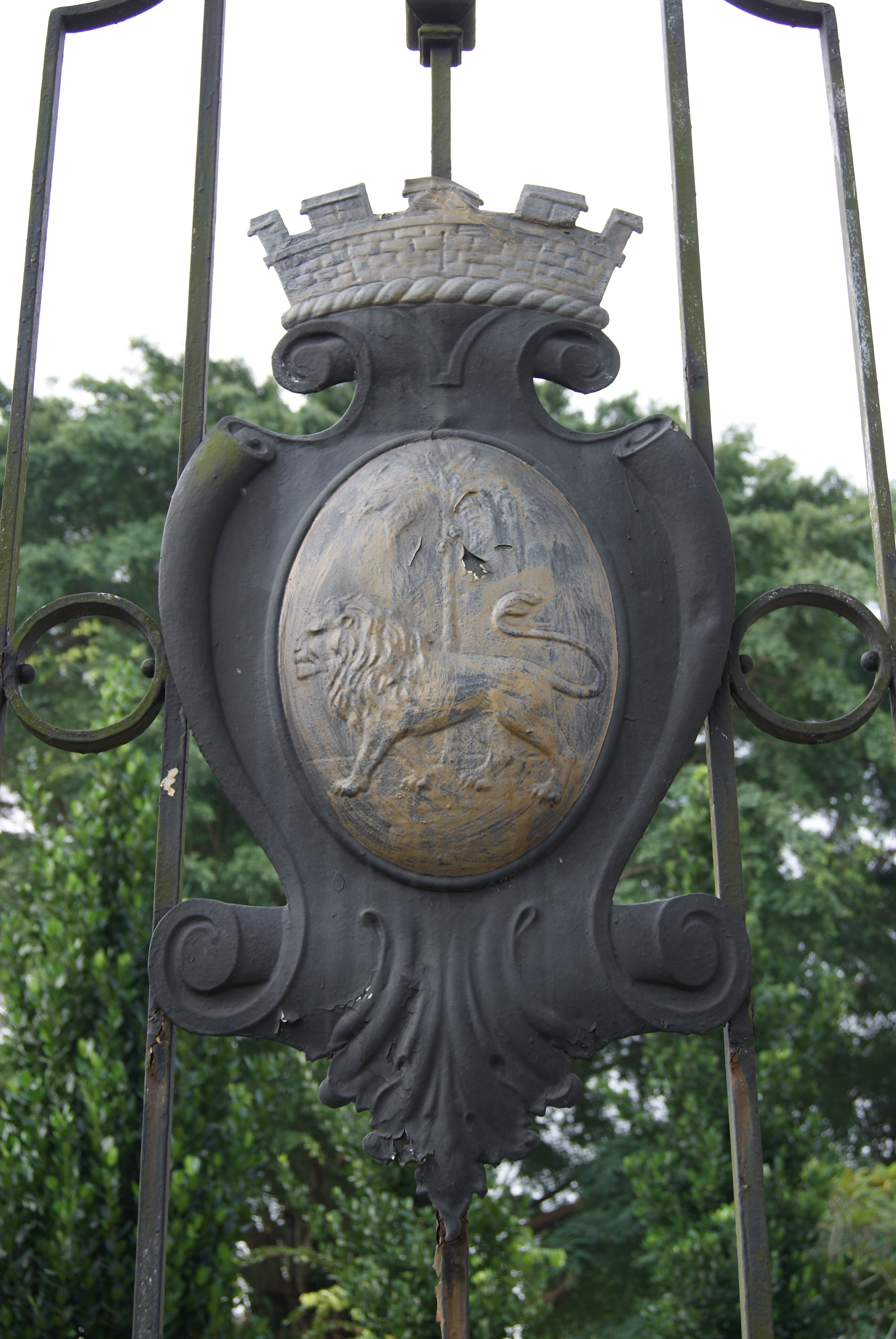
Crest of the Singapore Municipal Commission on the gate of the former Bidadari Cemetery

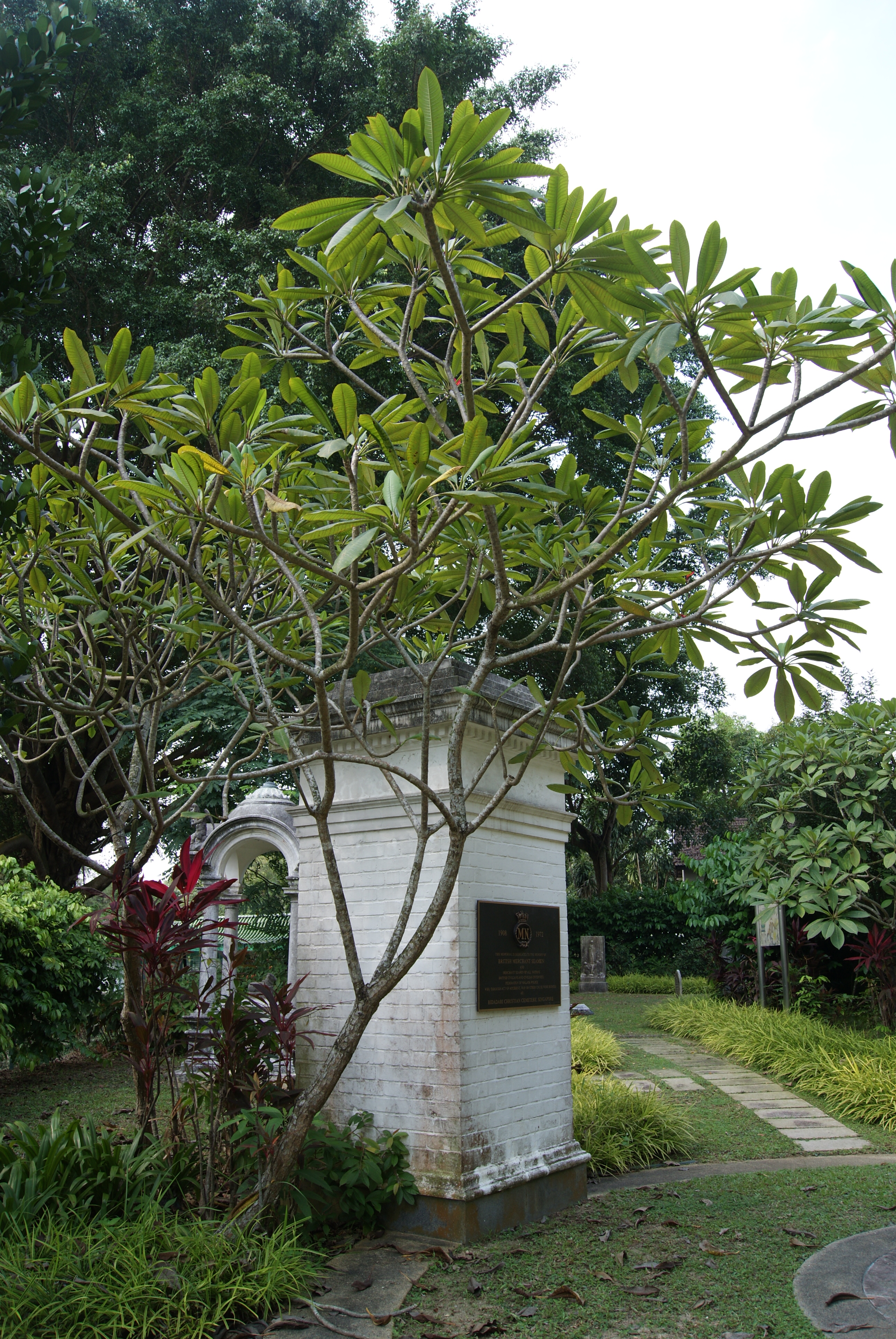
British Merchant Seamen Memorial

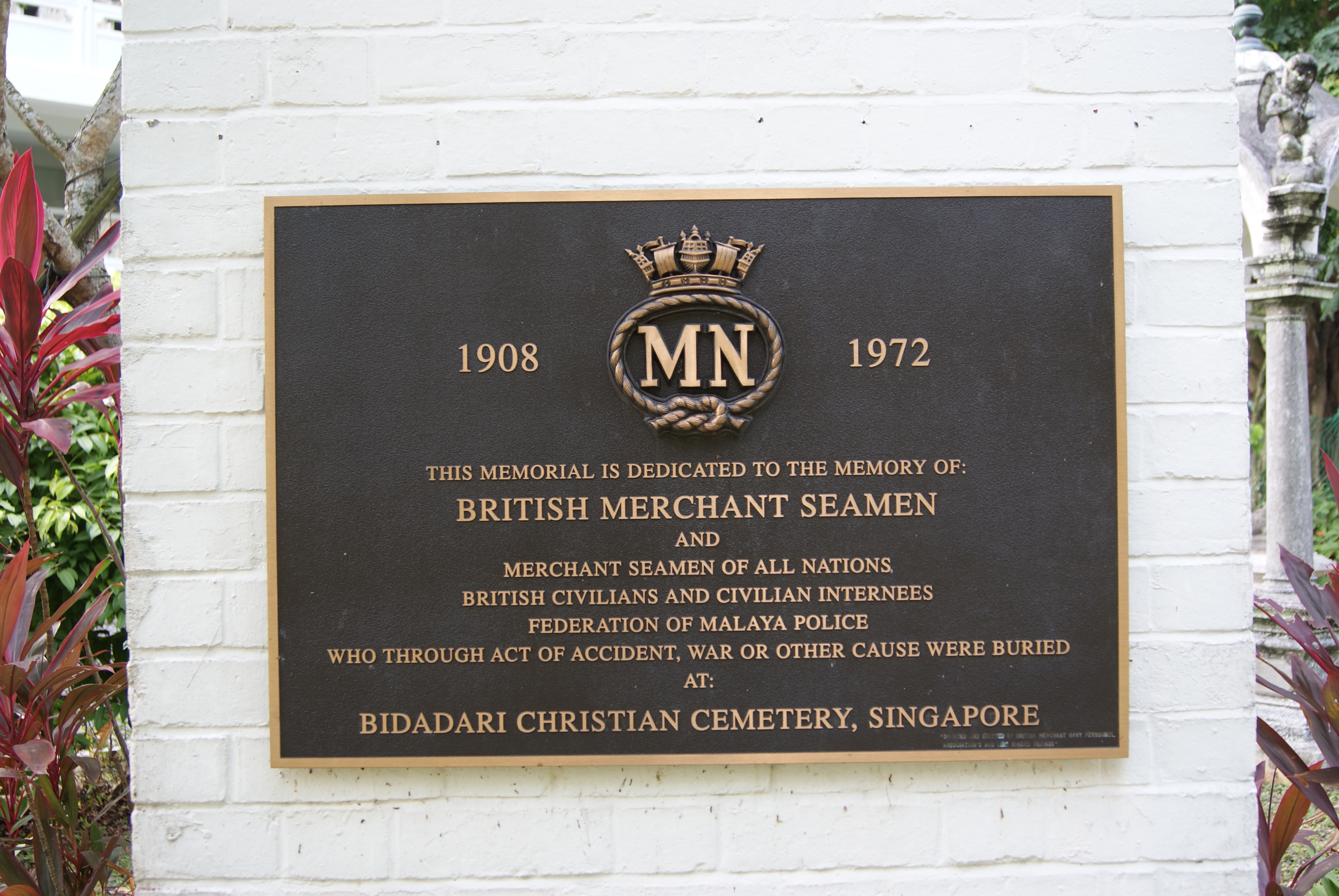
Close-up of British Merchant Seamen Memorial

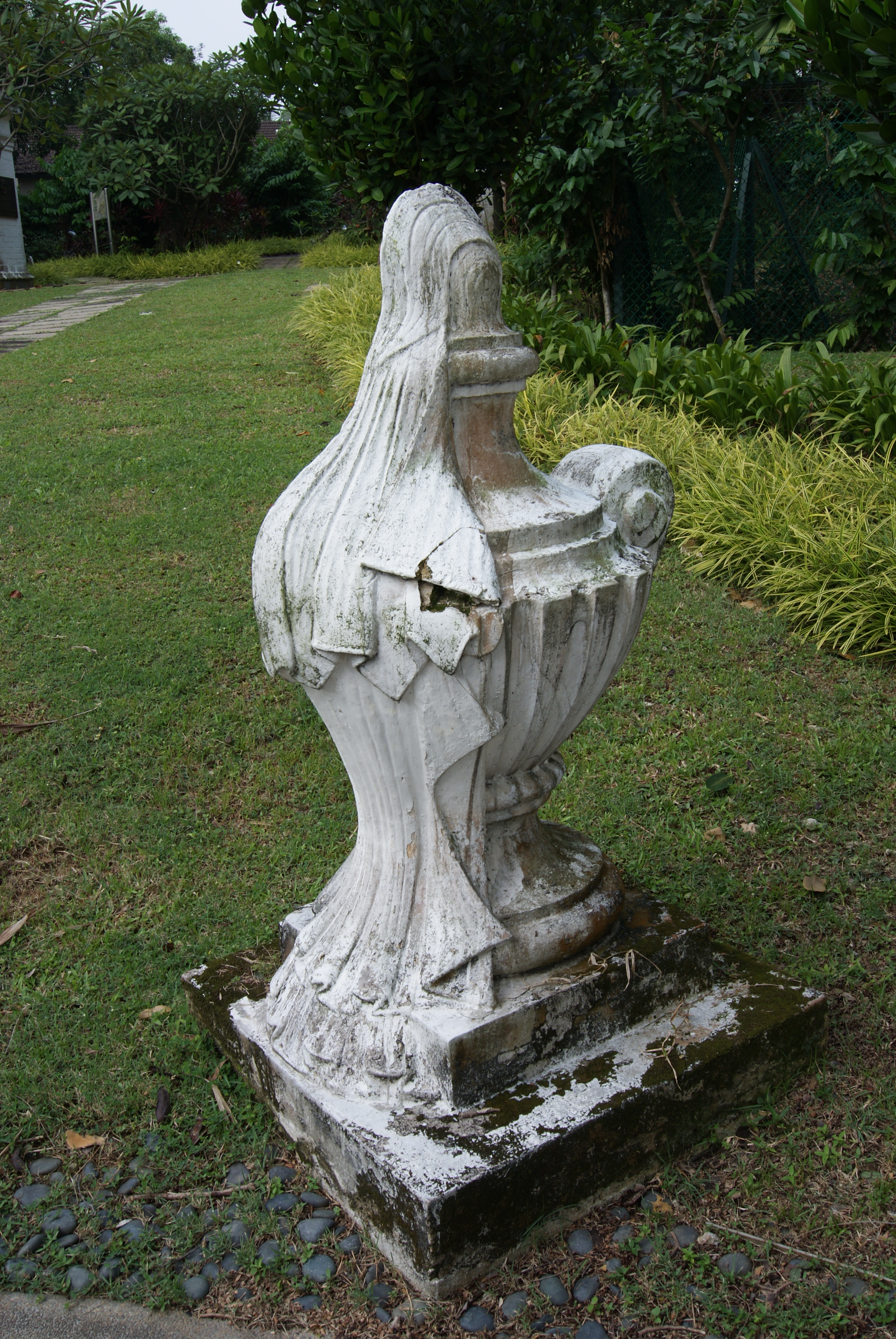

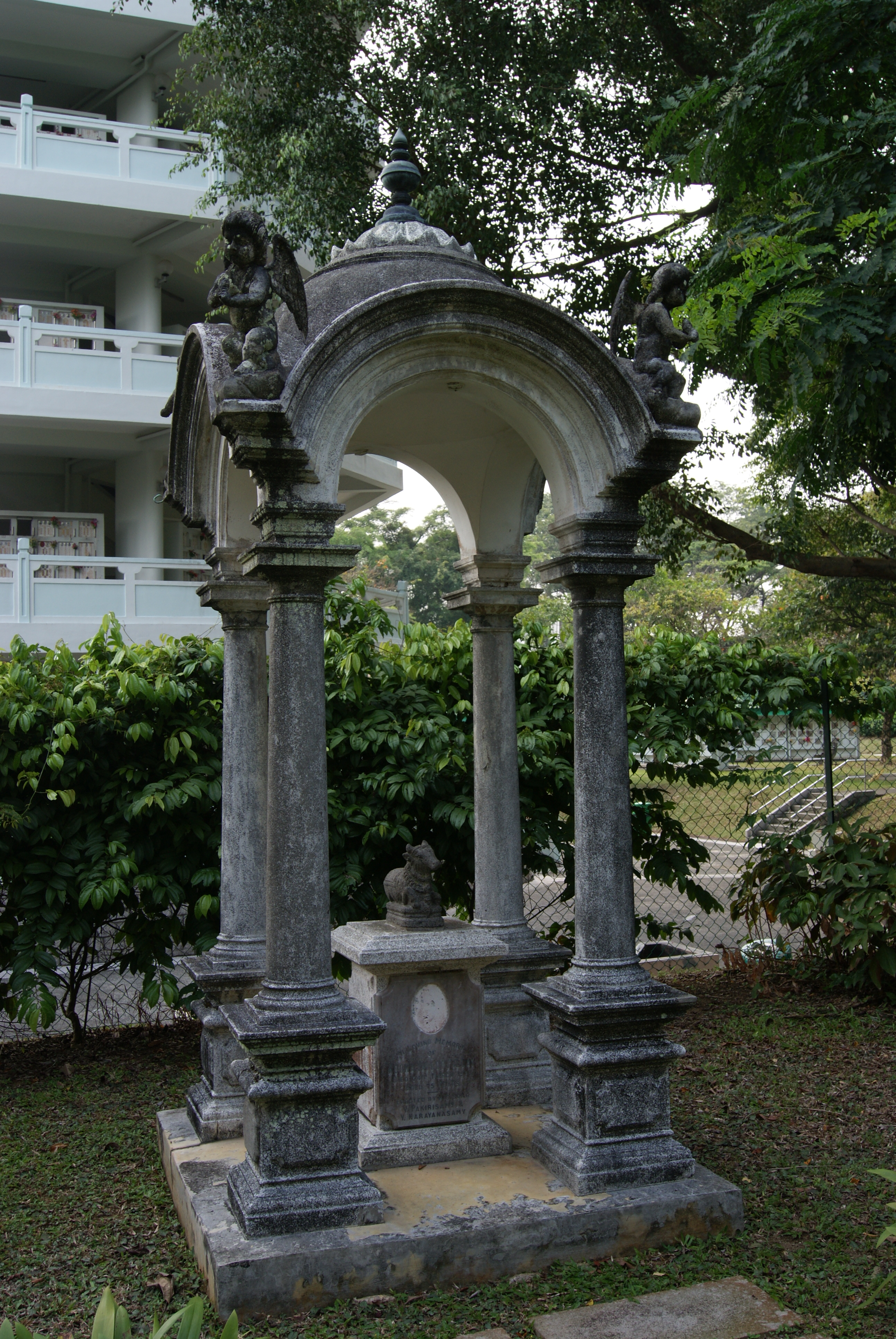
Gravestone of Koona Vayloo Pillai

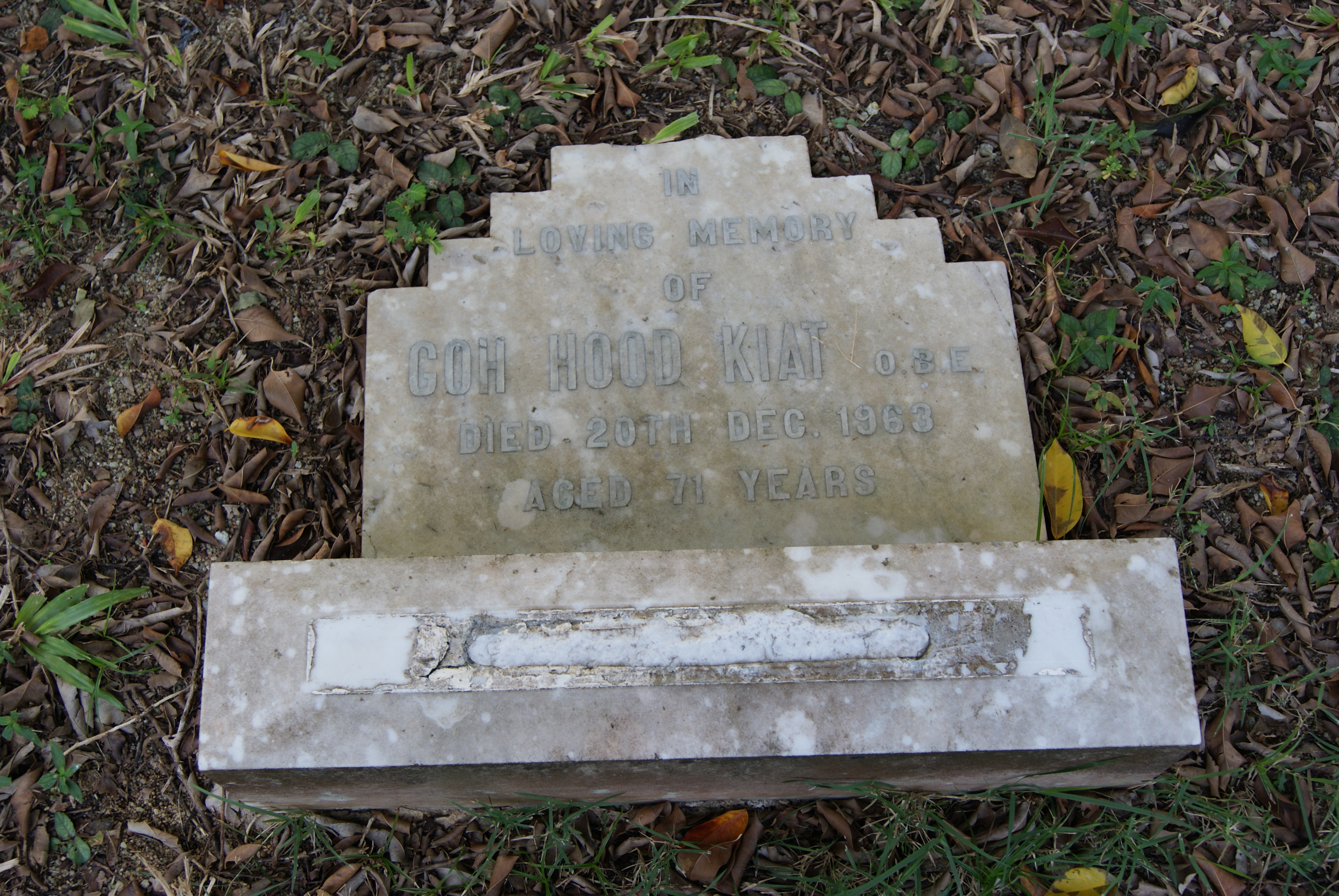
Gravestone of Goh Hood Kiat

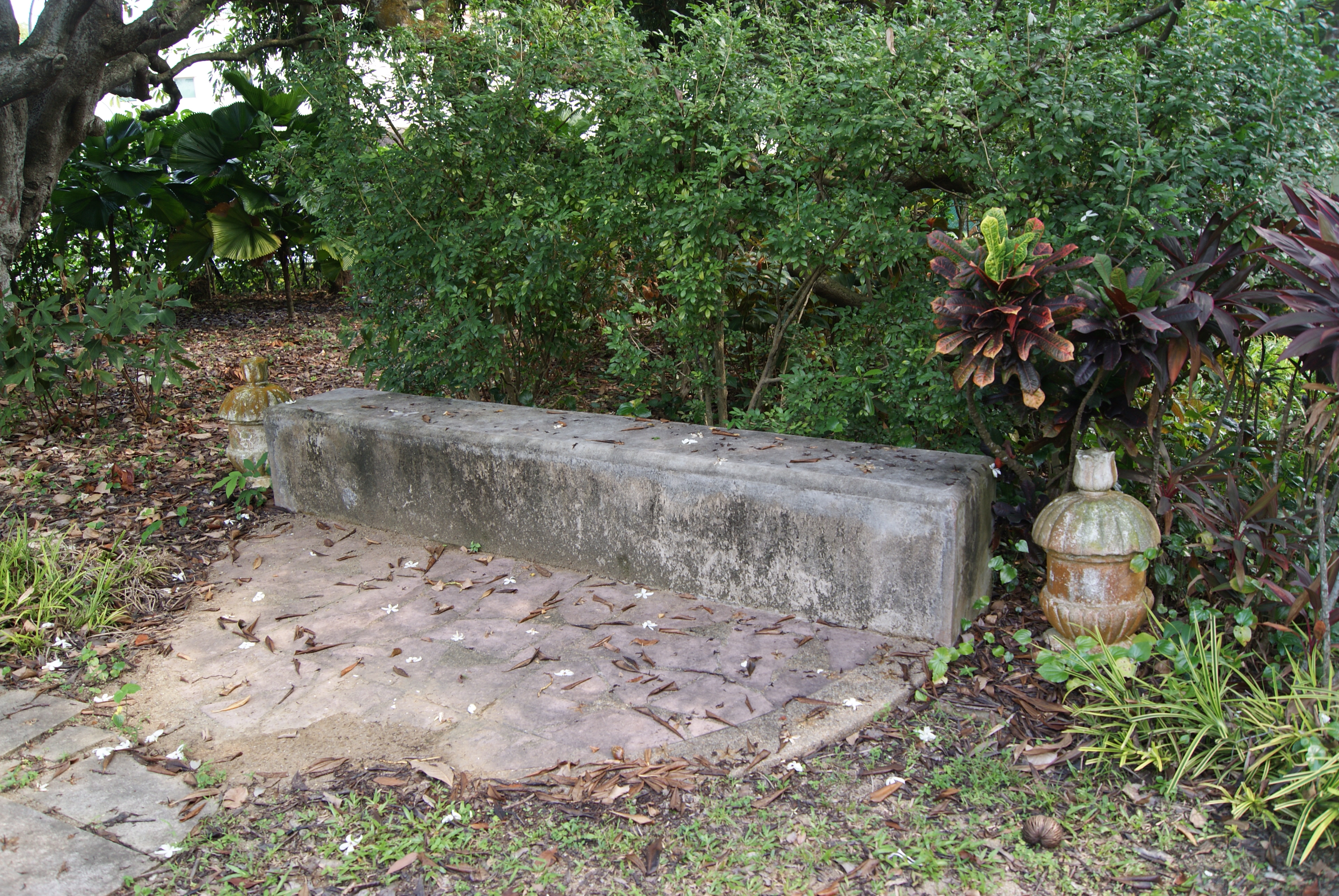
Bench and vase sculptures

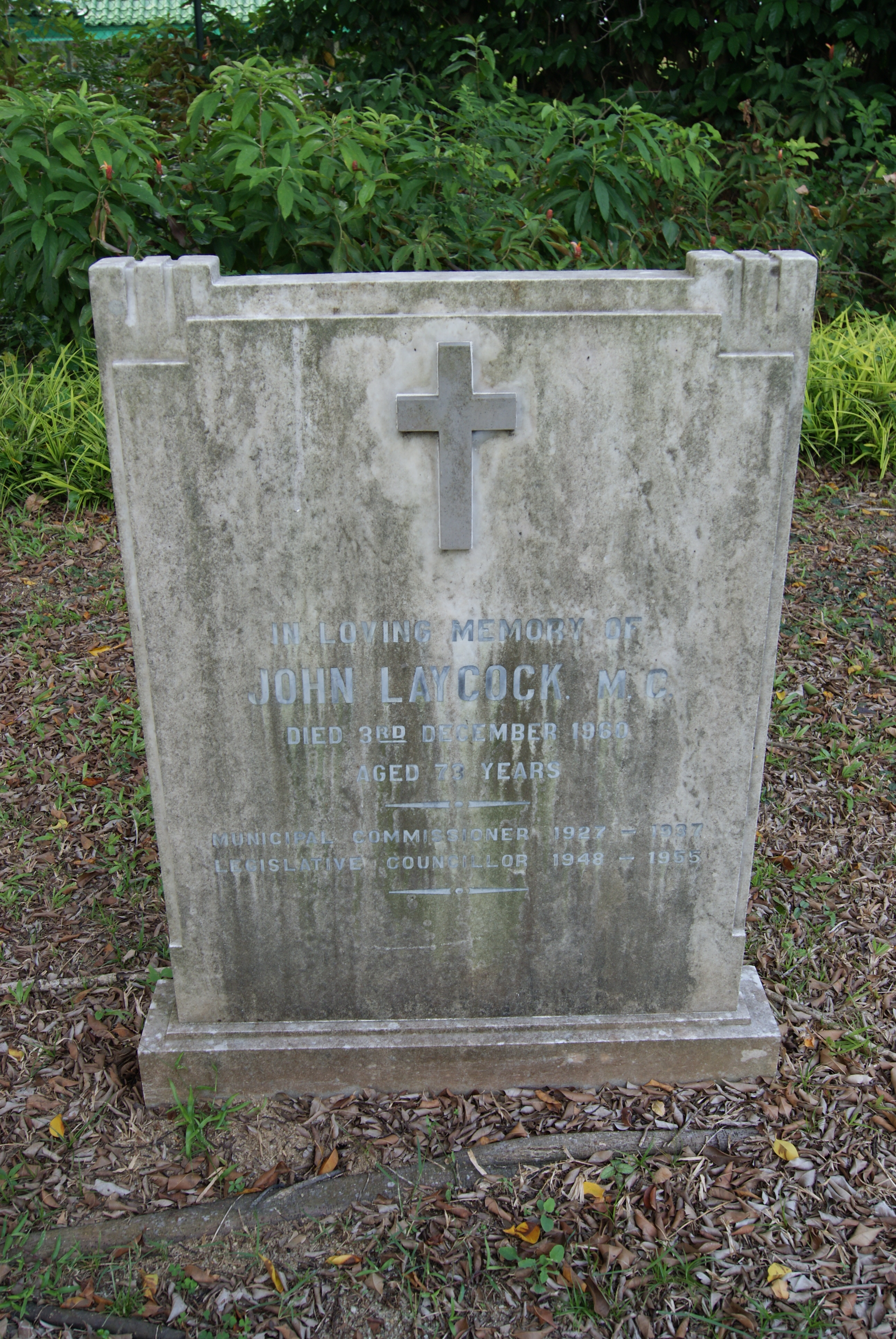
Gravestone of John Laycock

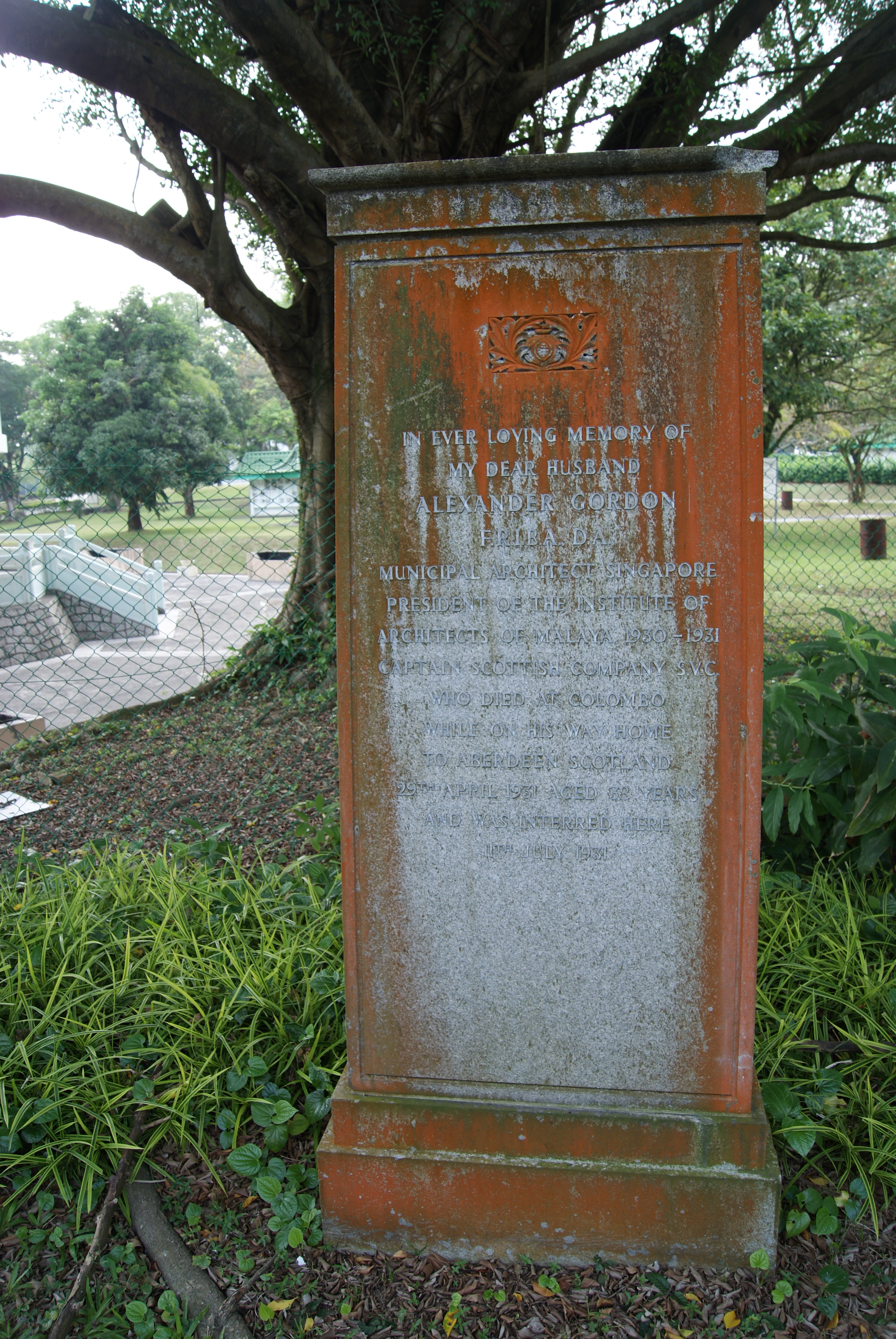
Gravestone of Alexander Gordon

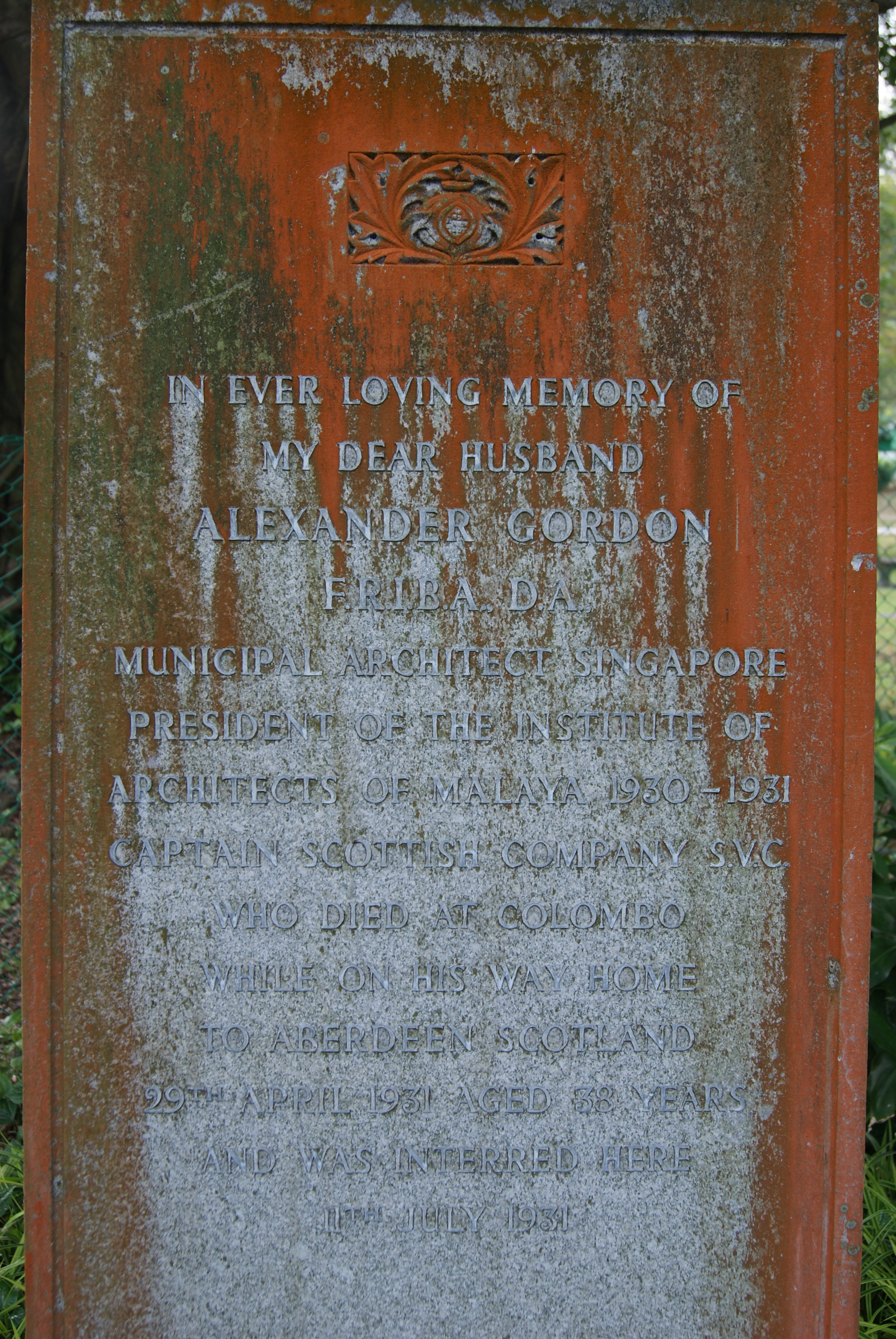
Close-up Gravestone of Alexander Gordon

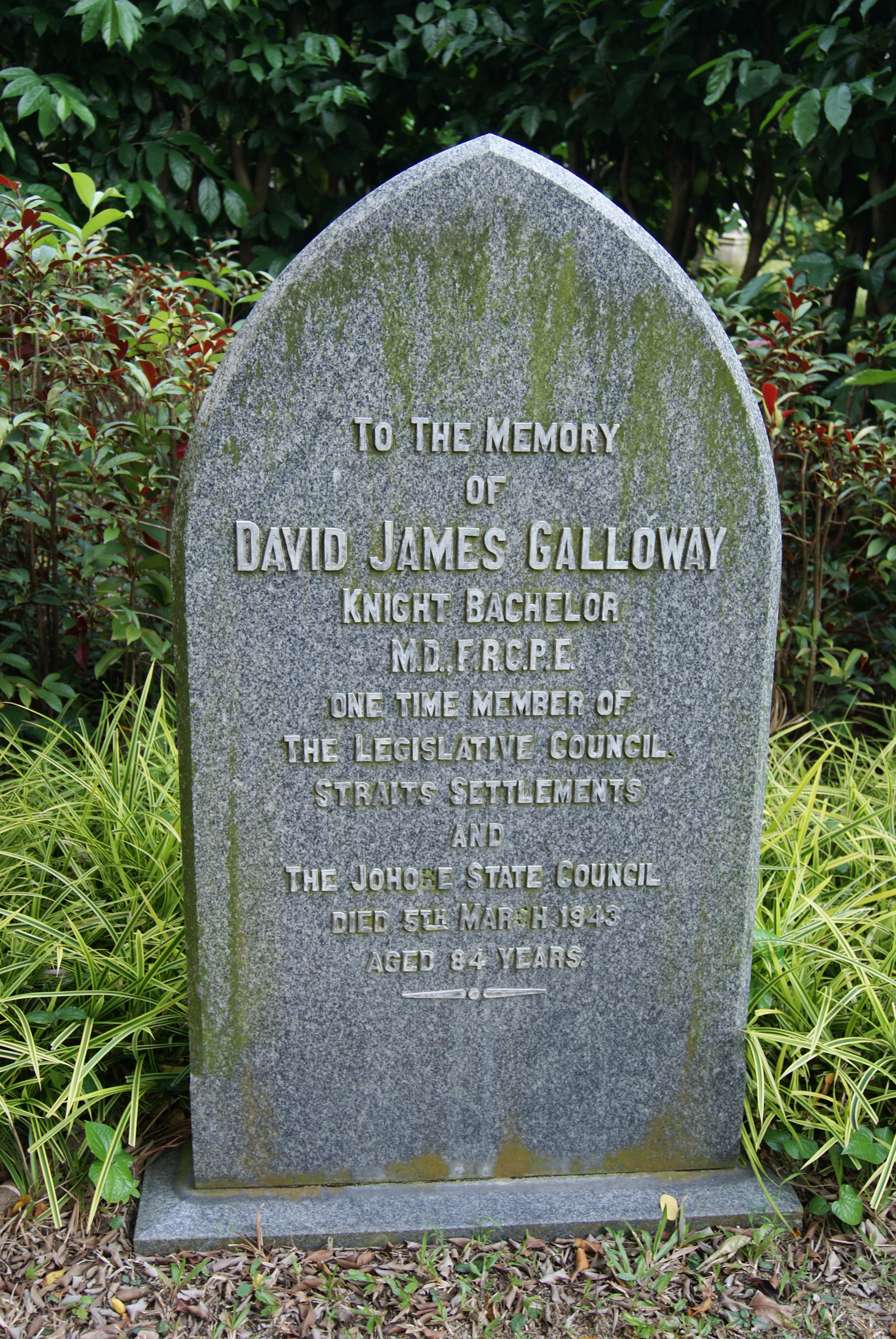
Gravestone of David James Galloway

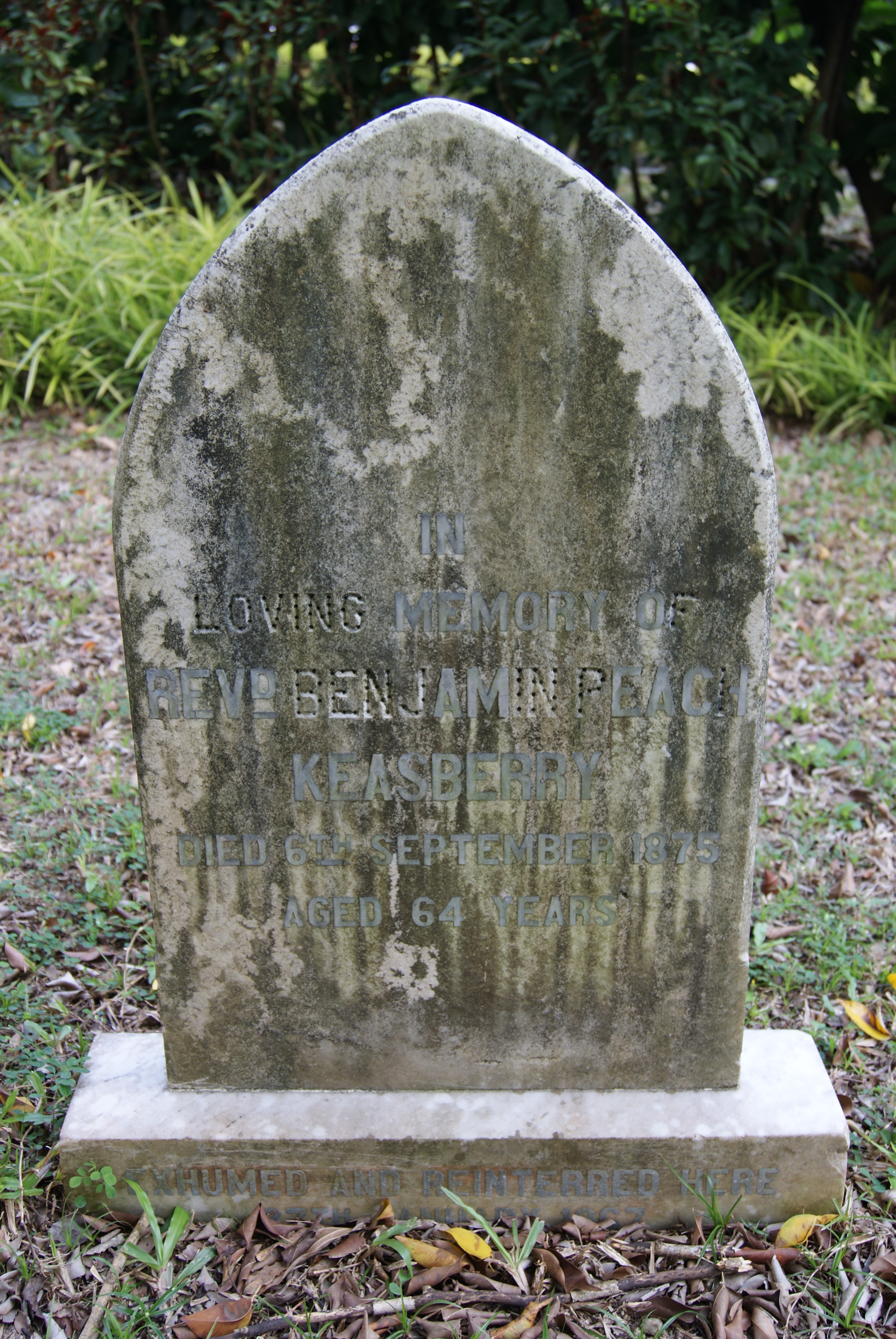
Gravestone of Benjamin Peach Keasberry

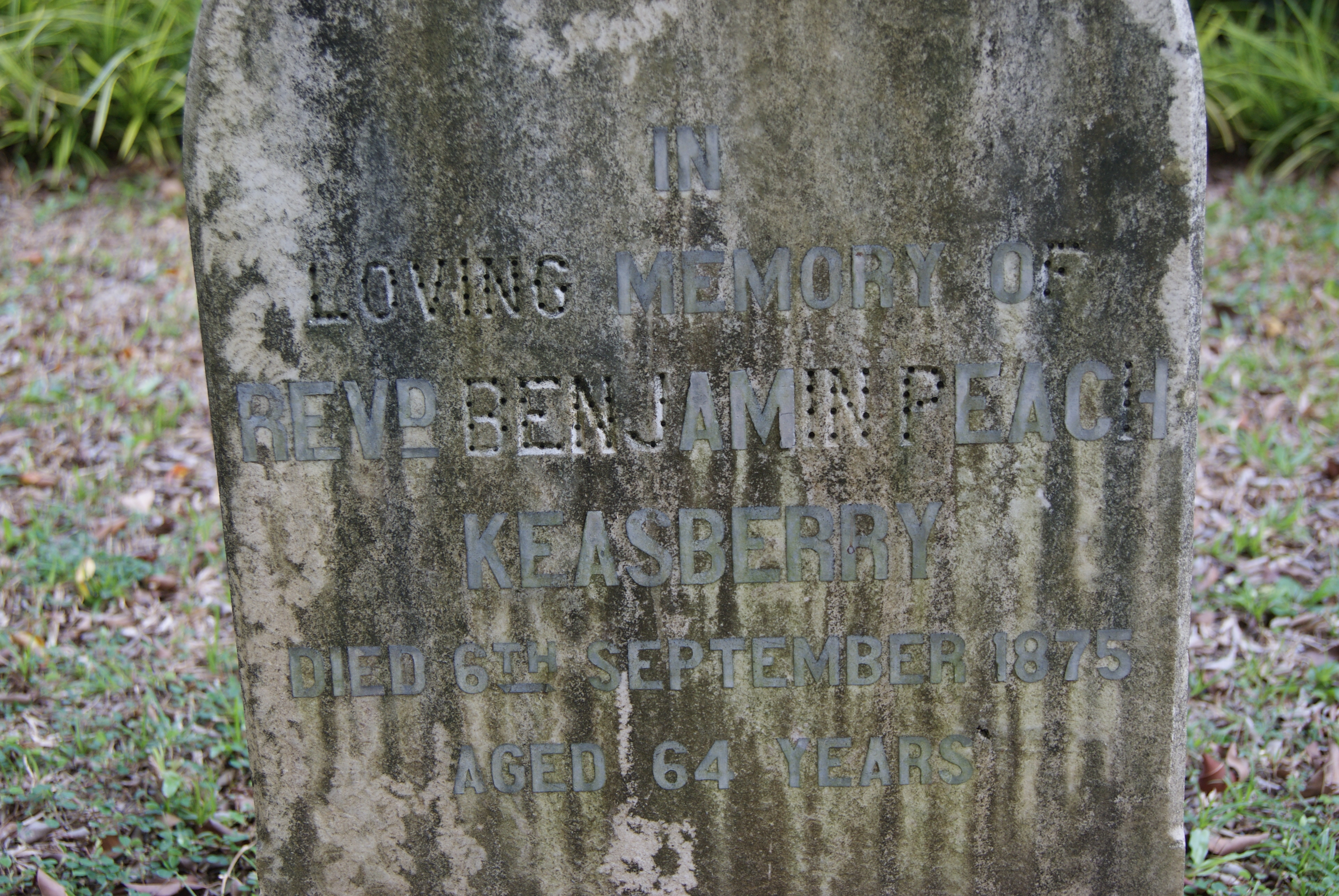
Close-up of Gravestone of Benjamin Peach Keasberry

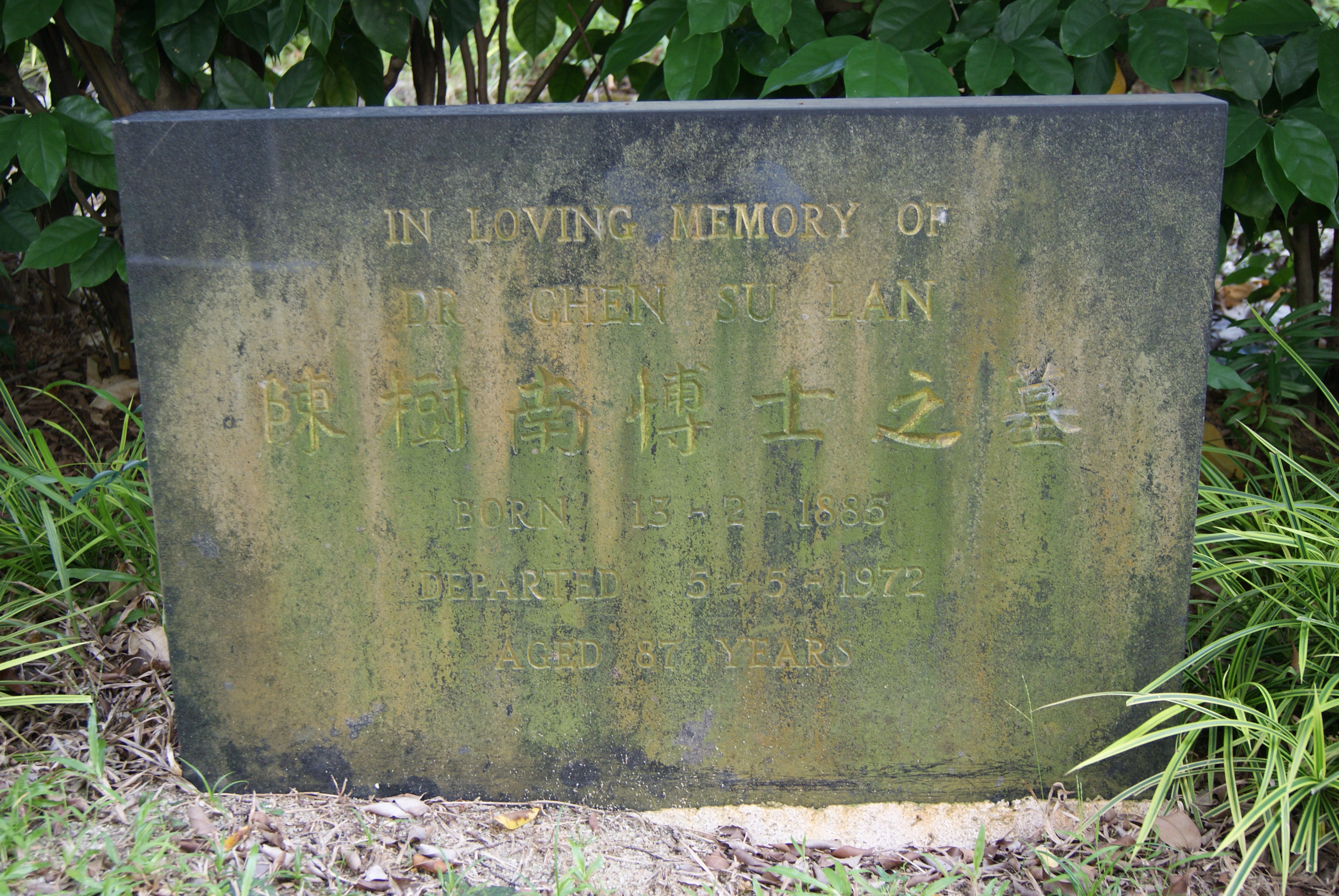
Gravestone of Chen Su Lan

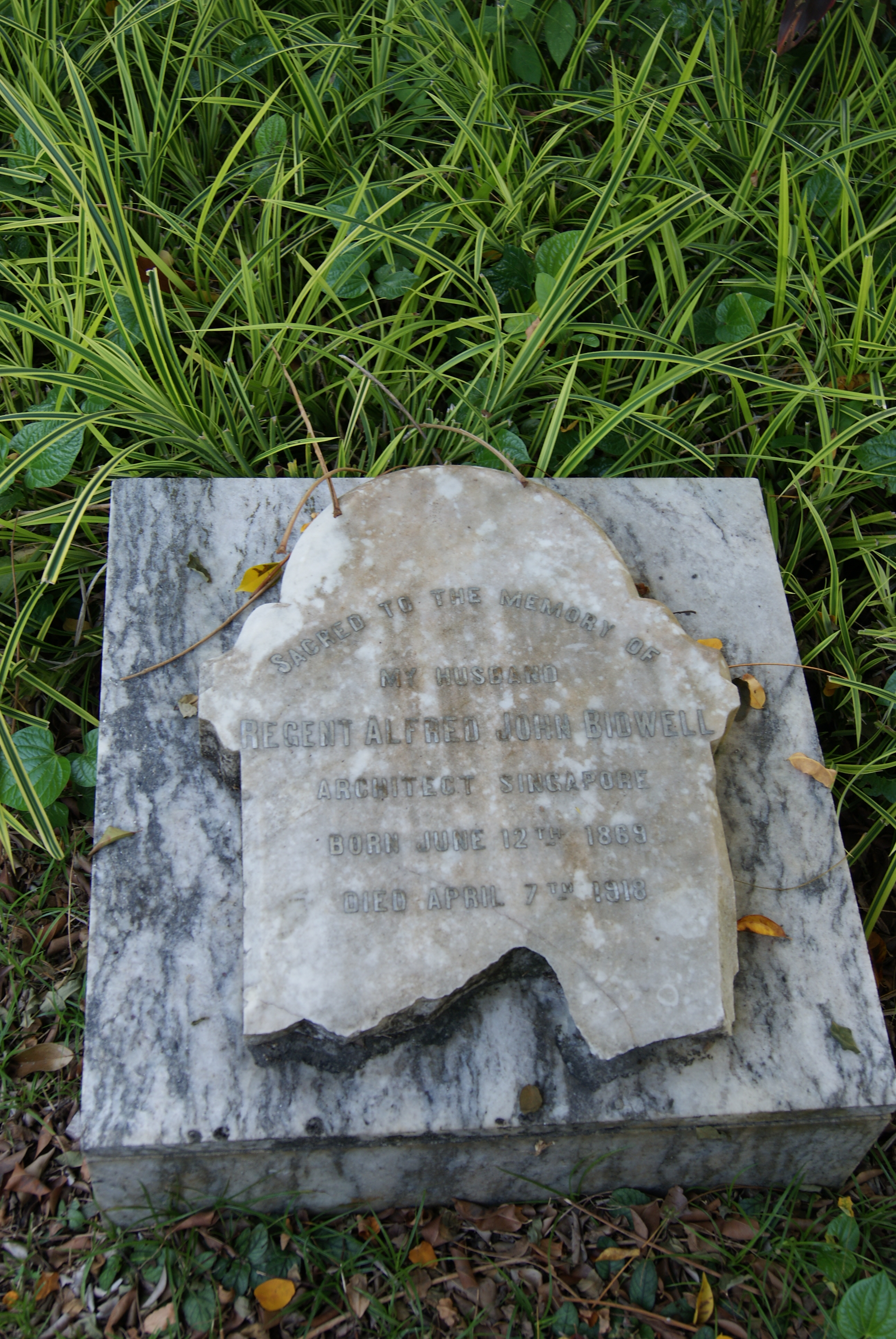
Gravestone of Regent Alfred John Bidwell

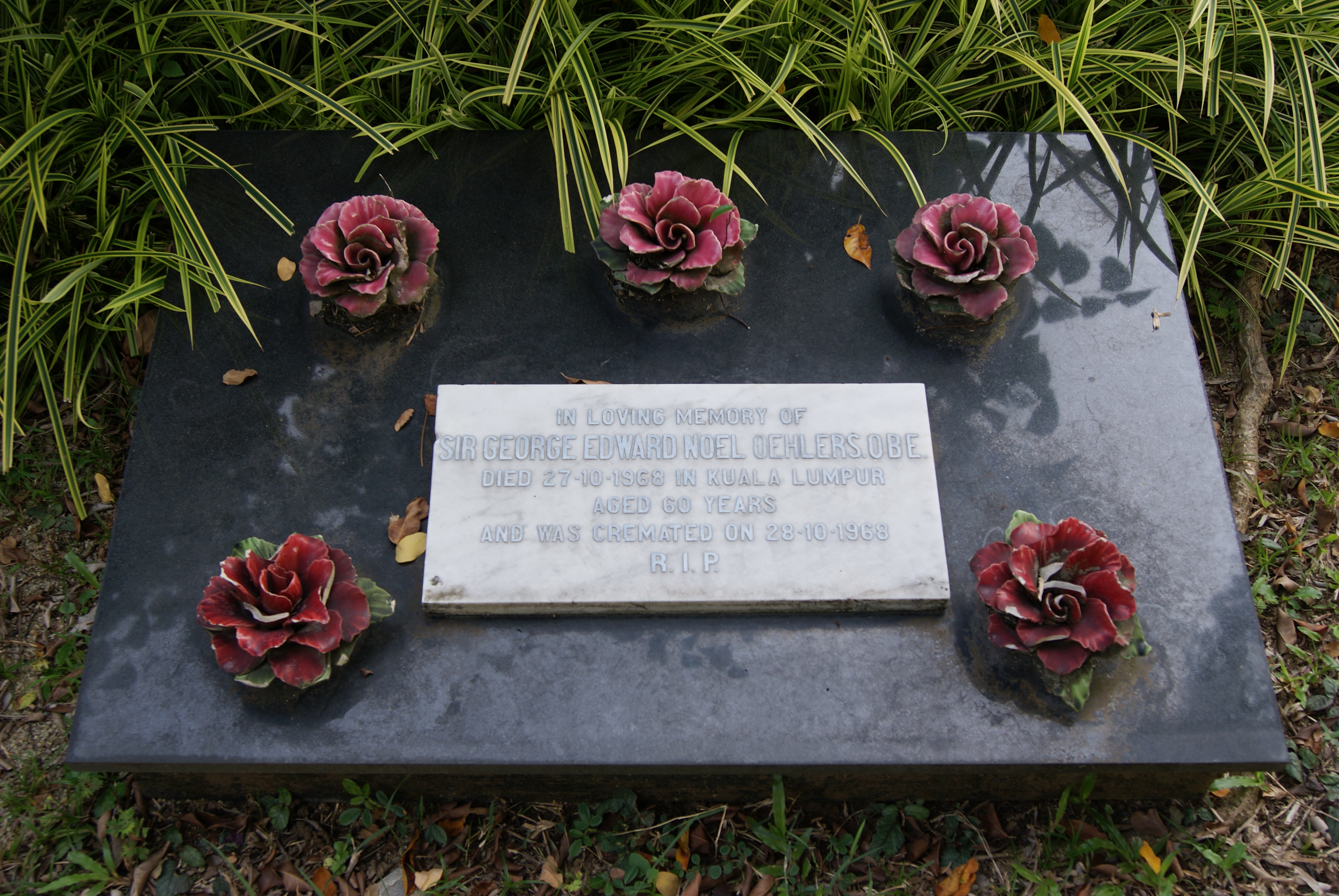
Gravestone of George Edward Noel Oehlers

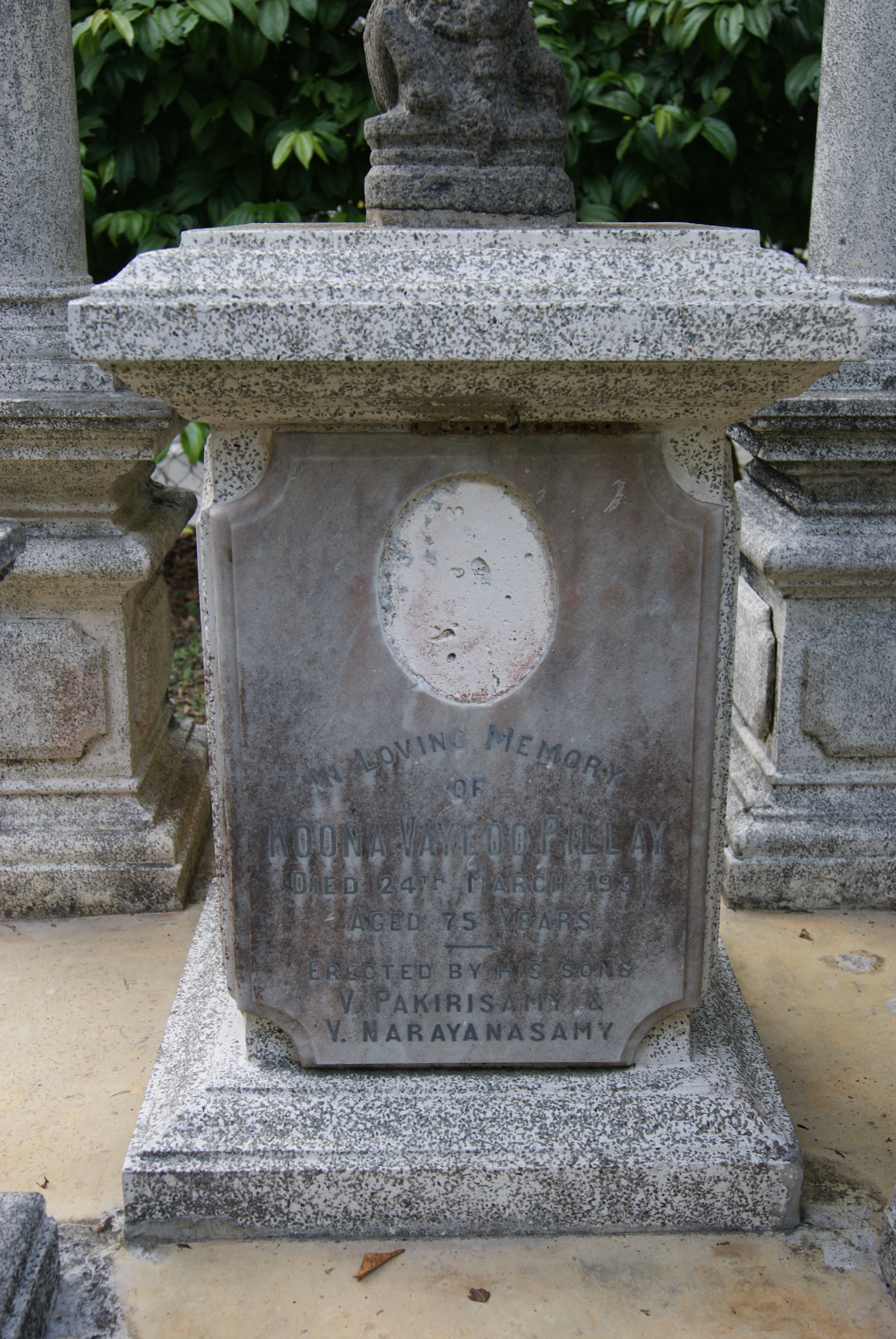
Gravestone of Koona Vayloo Pillai

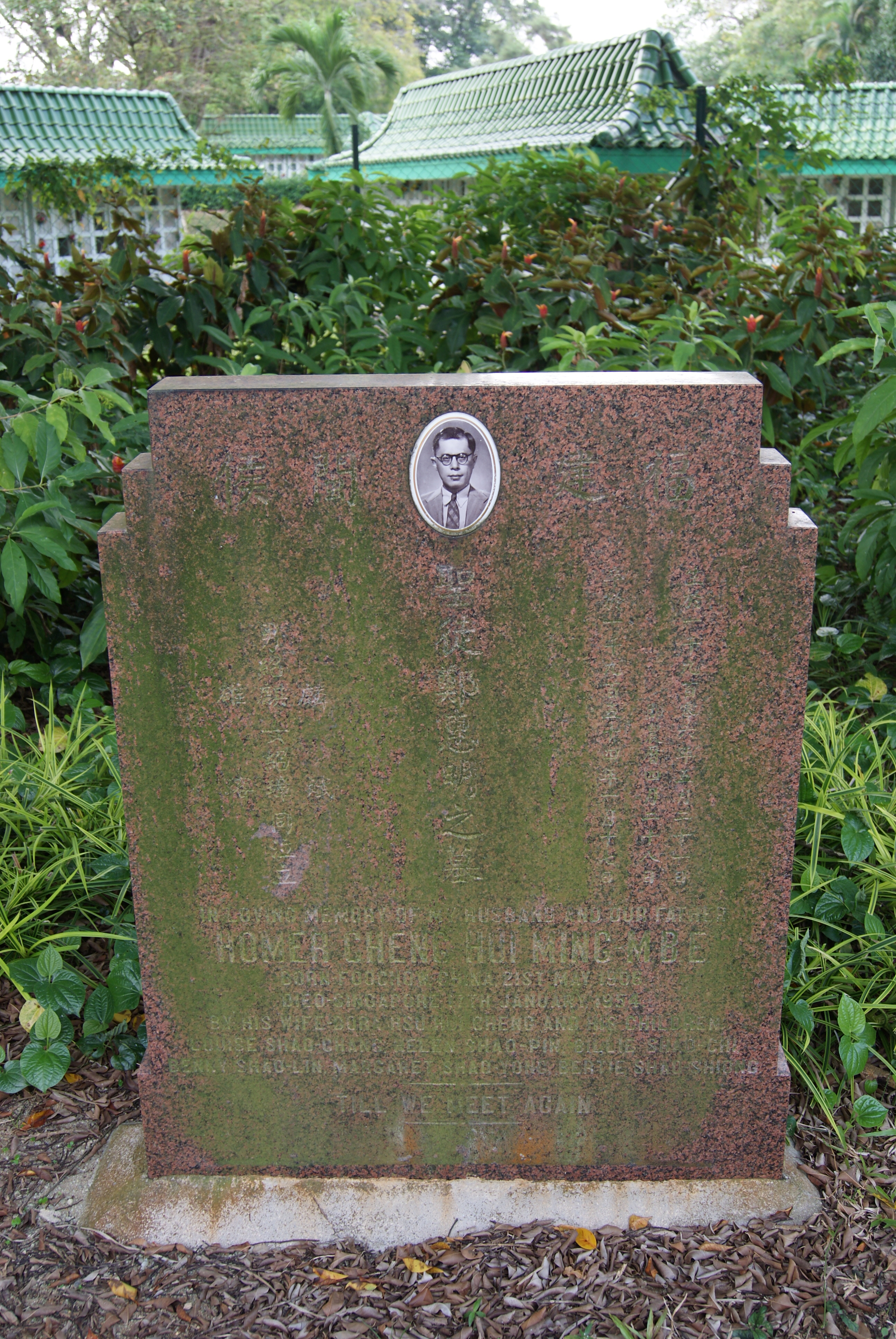
Gravestone of Homer Cheng Hui Ming

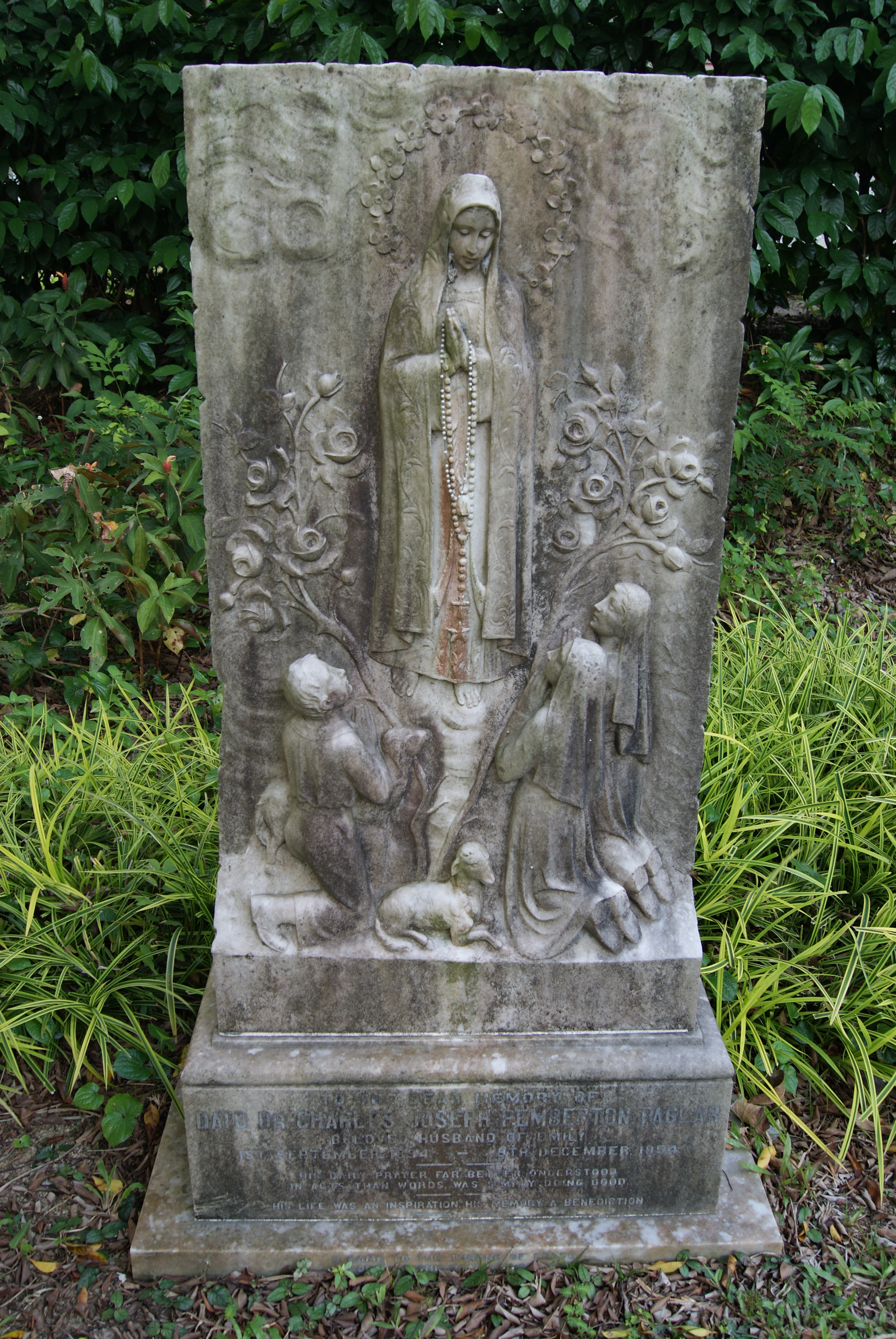
Gravestone of Charles Joseph Pemberton Paglar

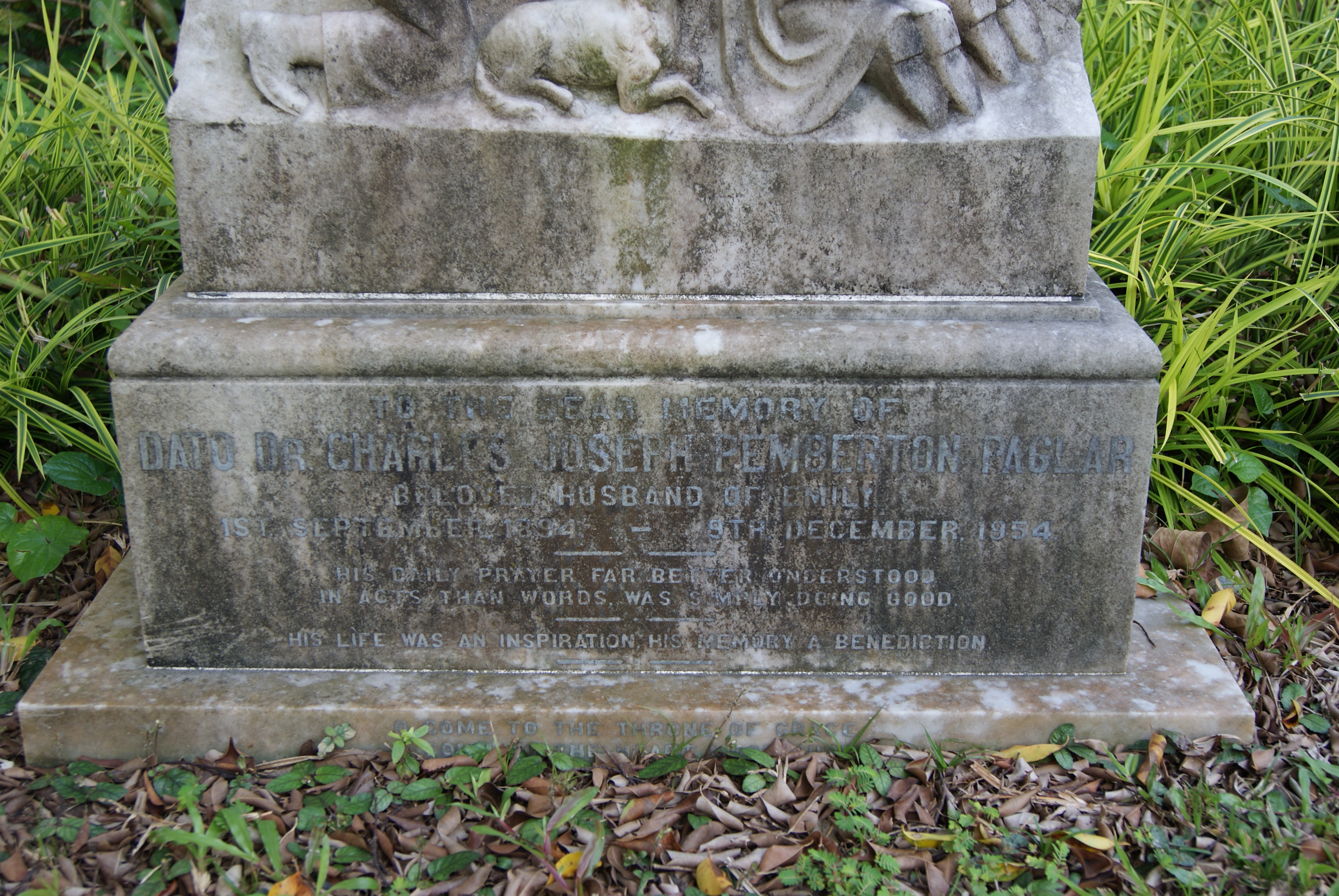
Close-up Gravestone of Charles Joseph Pemberton Paglar

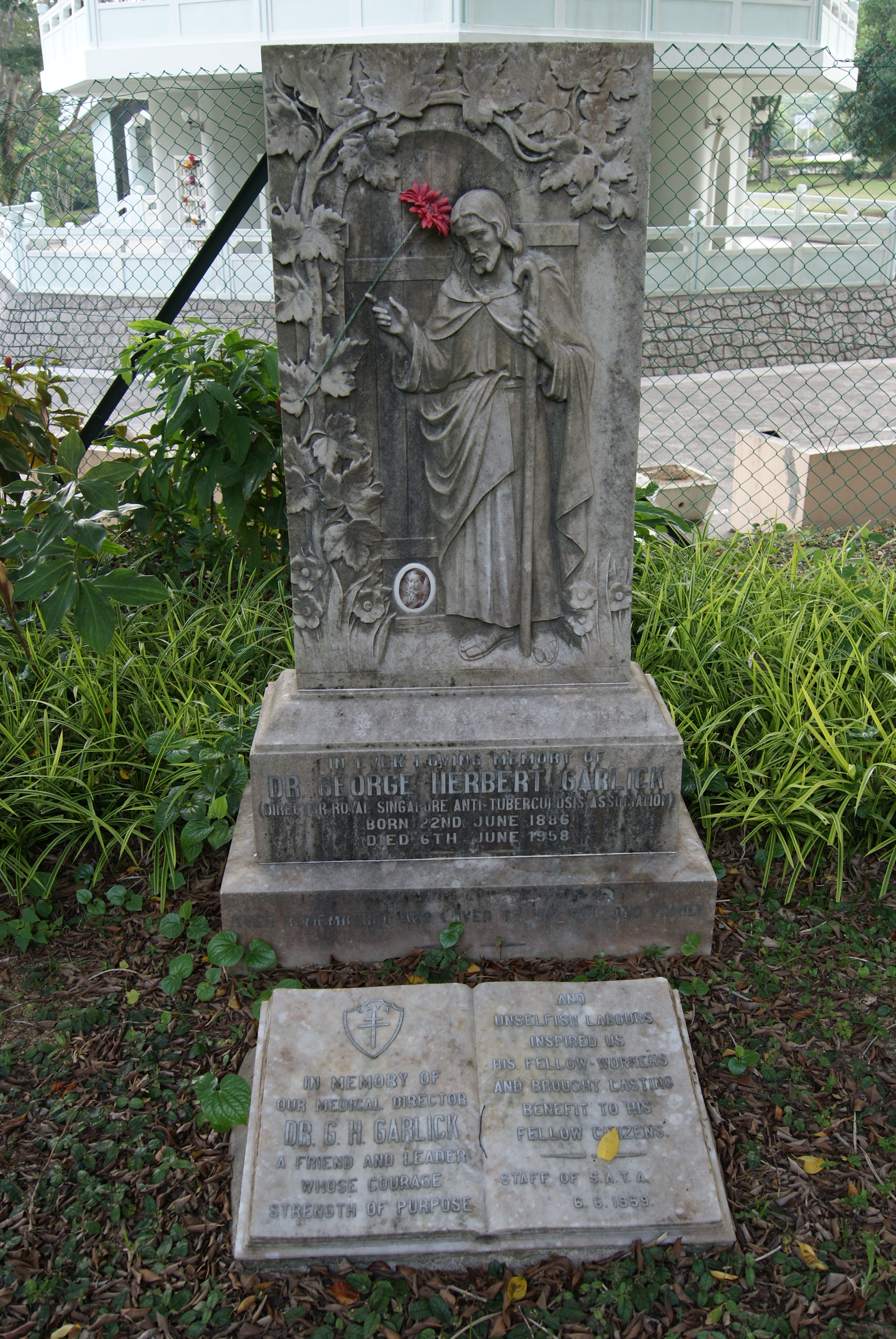
Close-up Gravestone of George Herbert Garlick

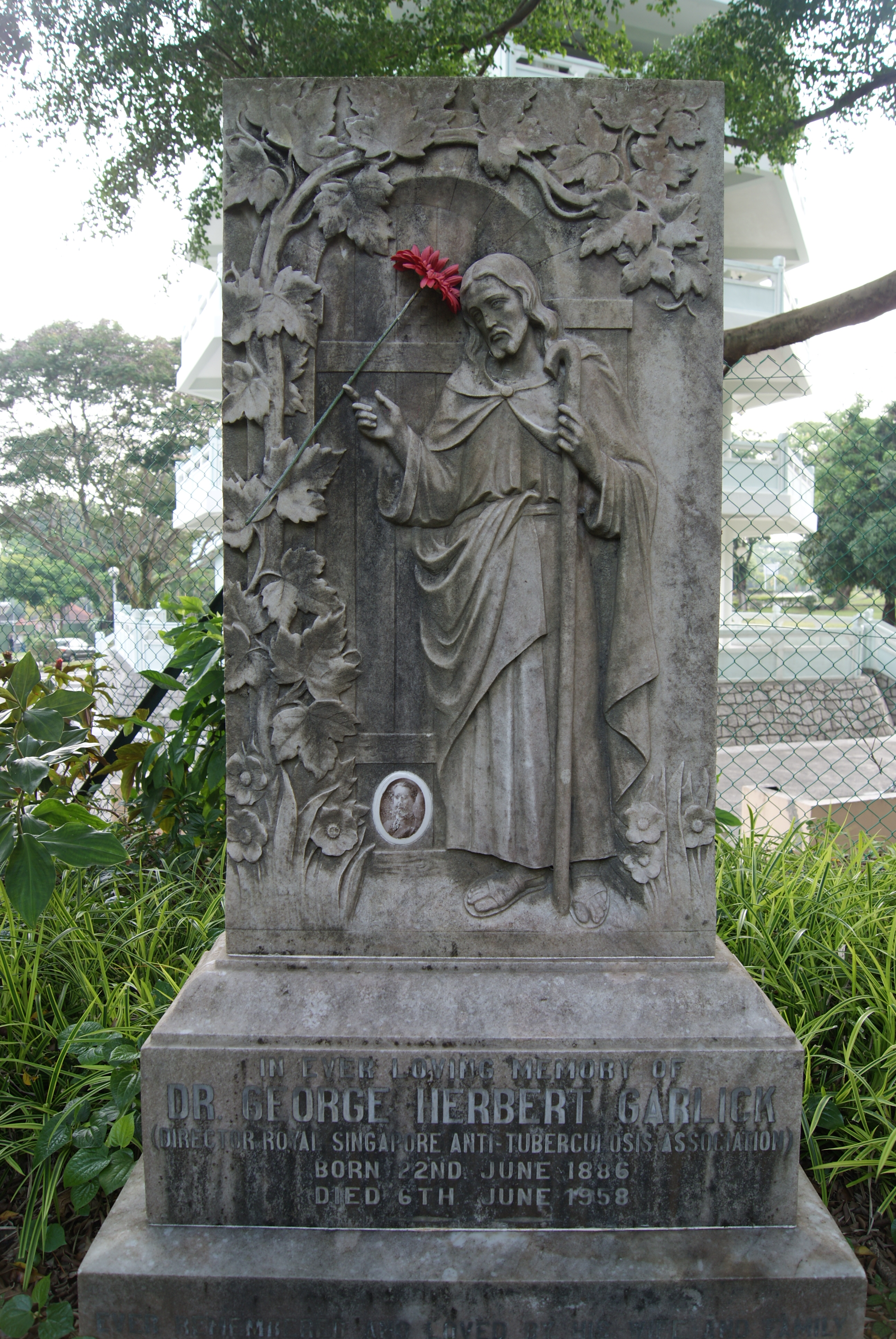
Gravestone of George Herbert Garlick

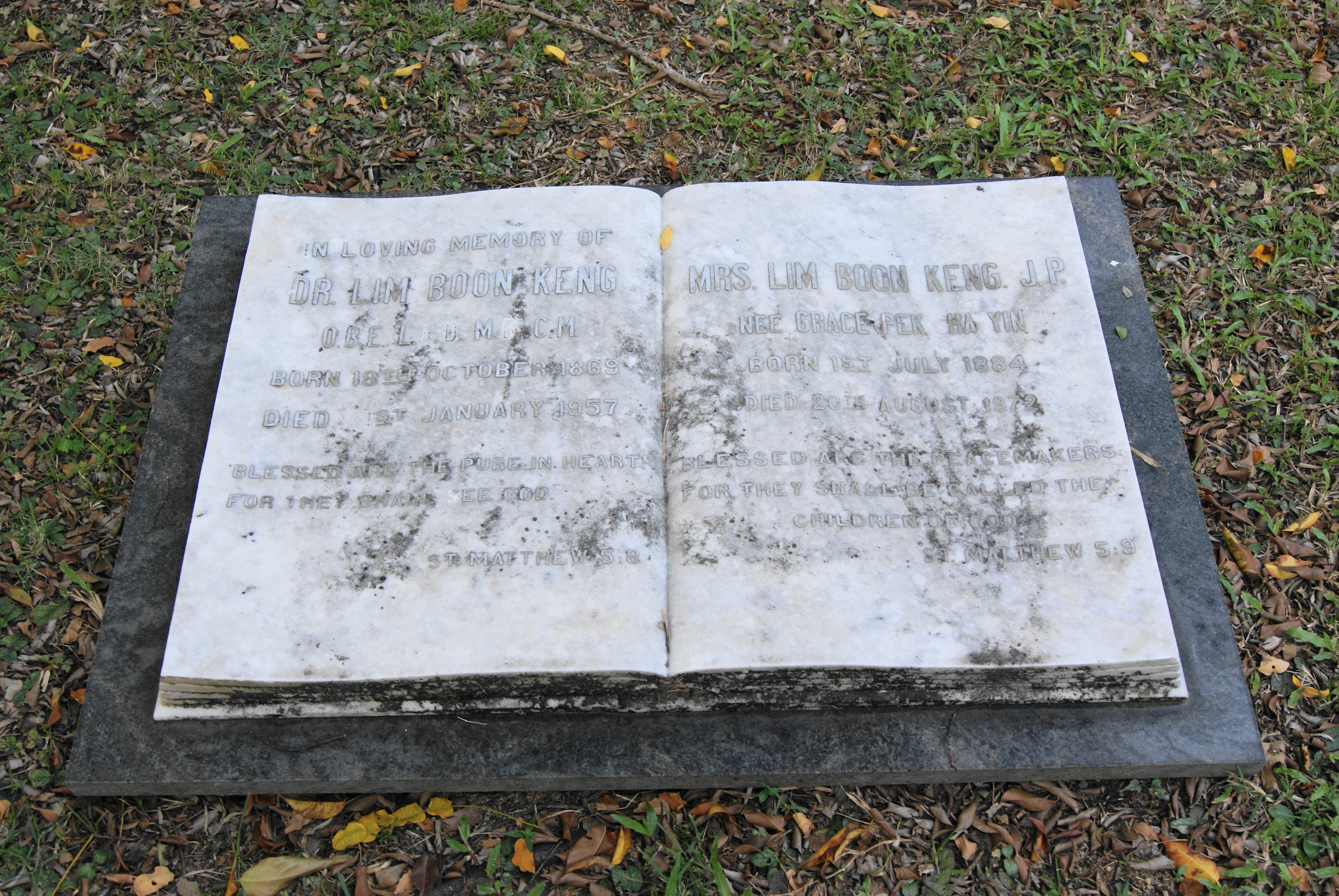
Gravestone of Lim Boon Keng and Grace Pek Ha Yin

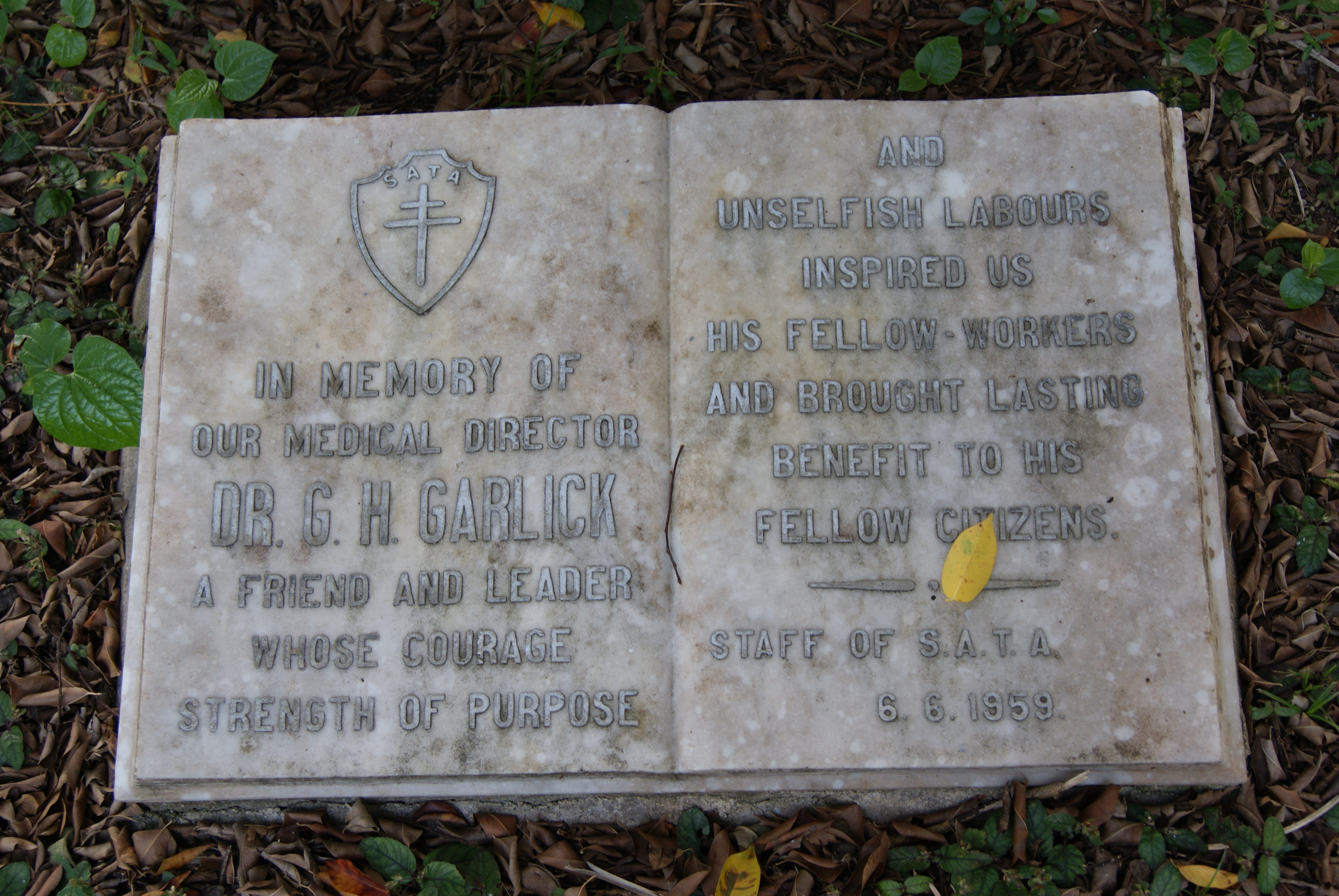
Close-up Gravestone of George Herbert Garlick

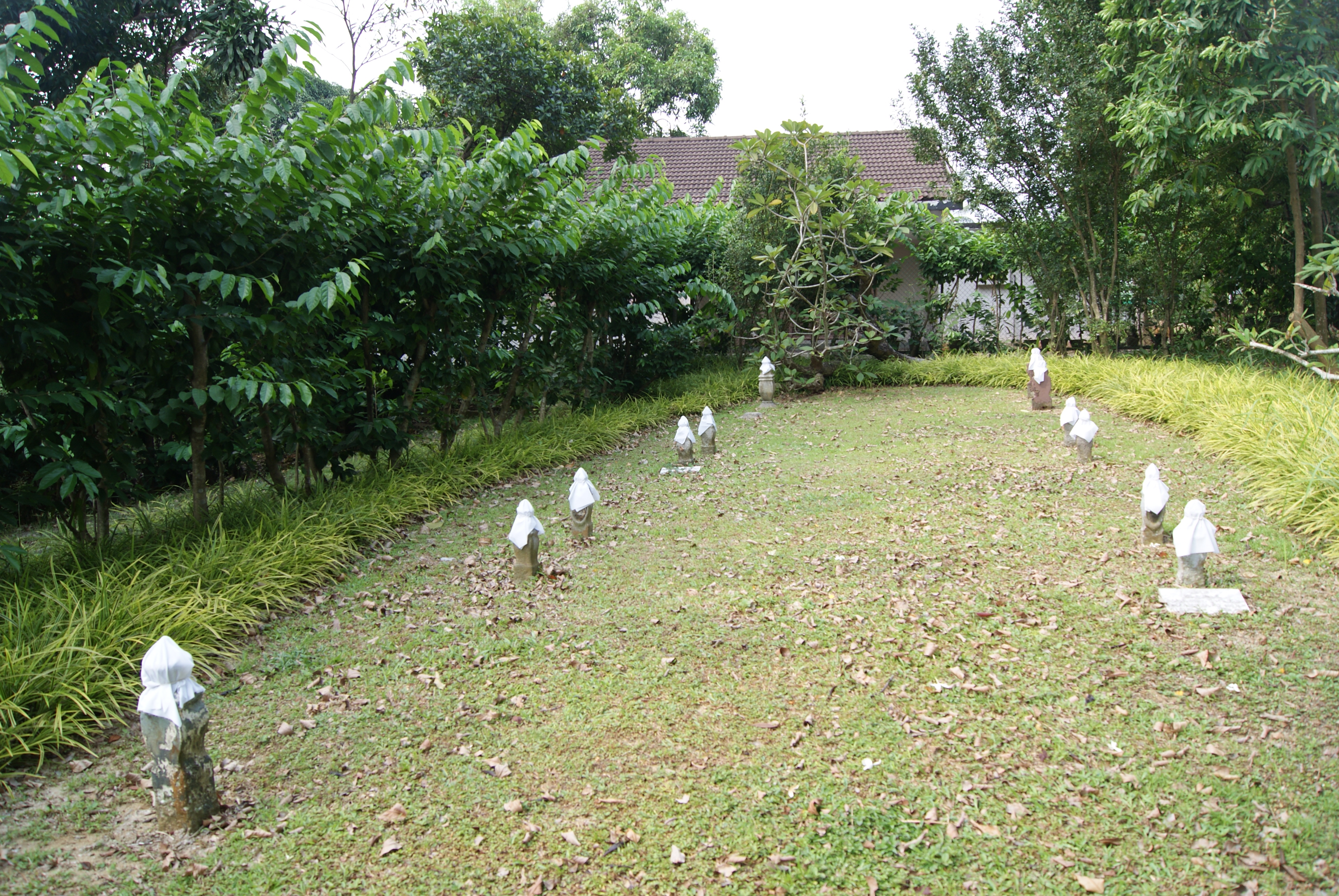
Muslim gravestones in Bidadari Garden

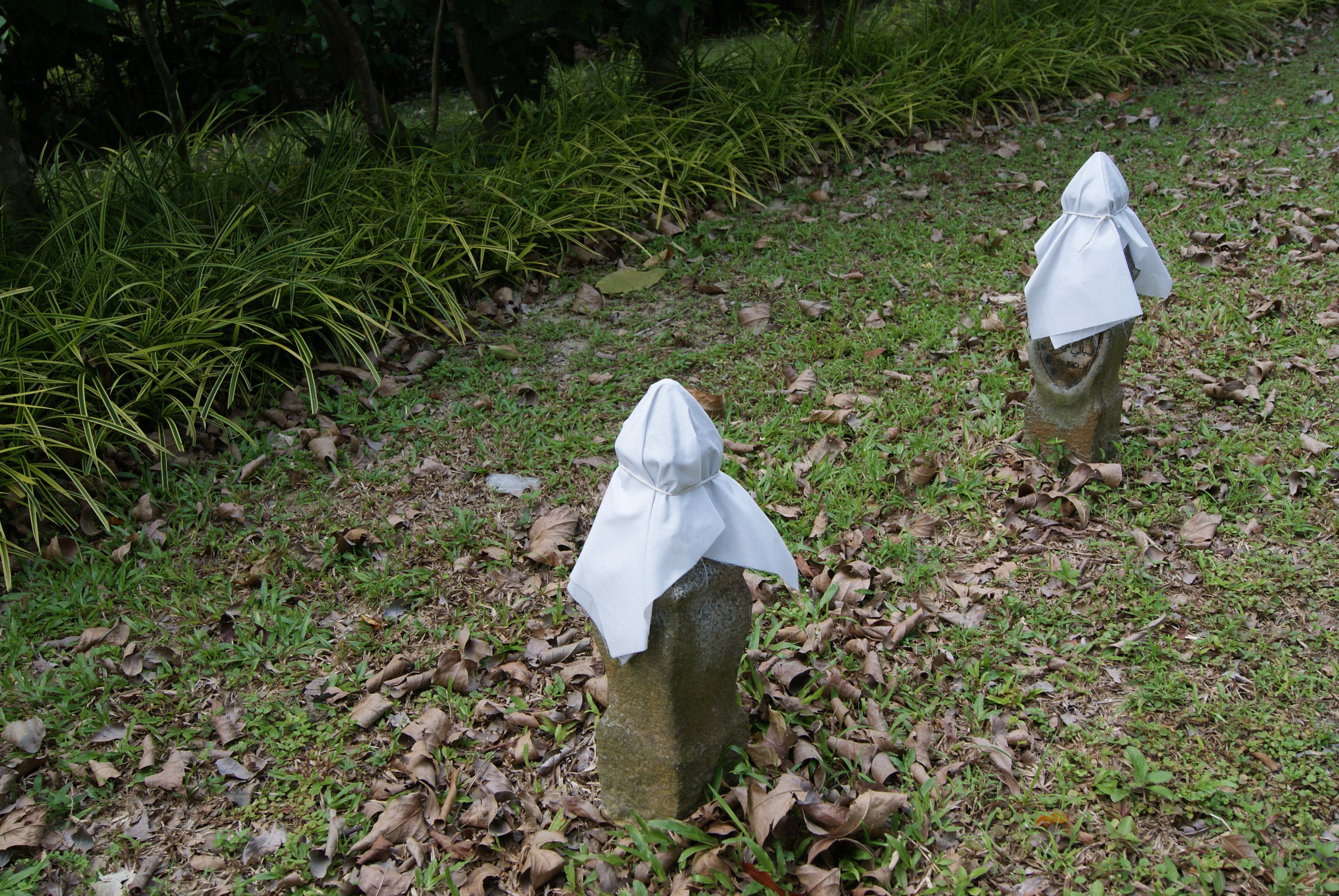
Gravestone of Baharudin bin Mohd Ariff

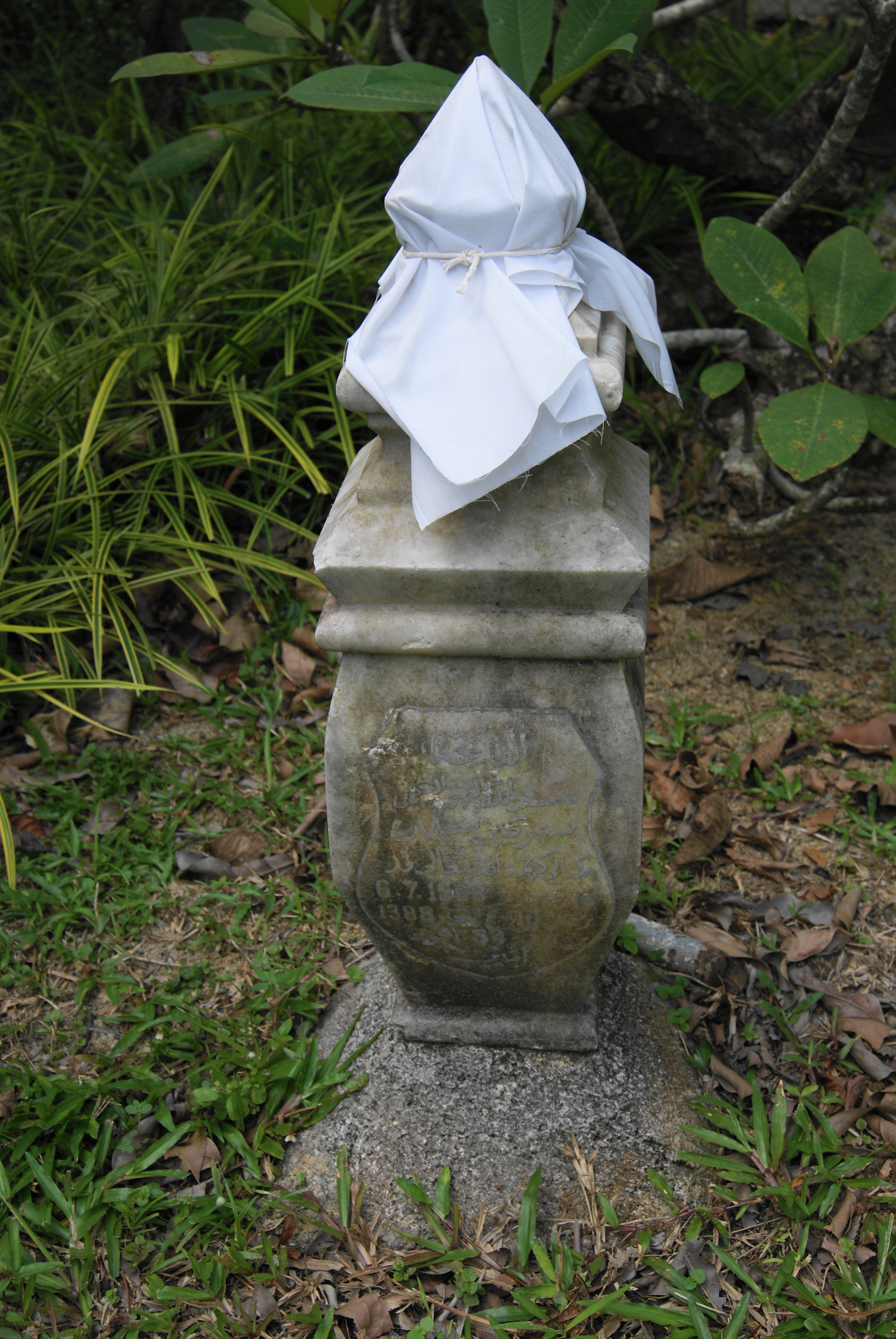
Gravestone of Sahari Sulaiman

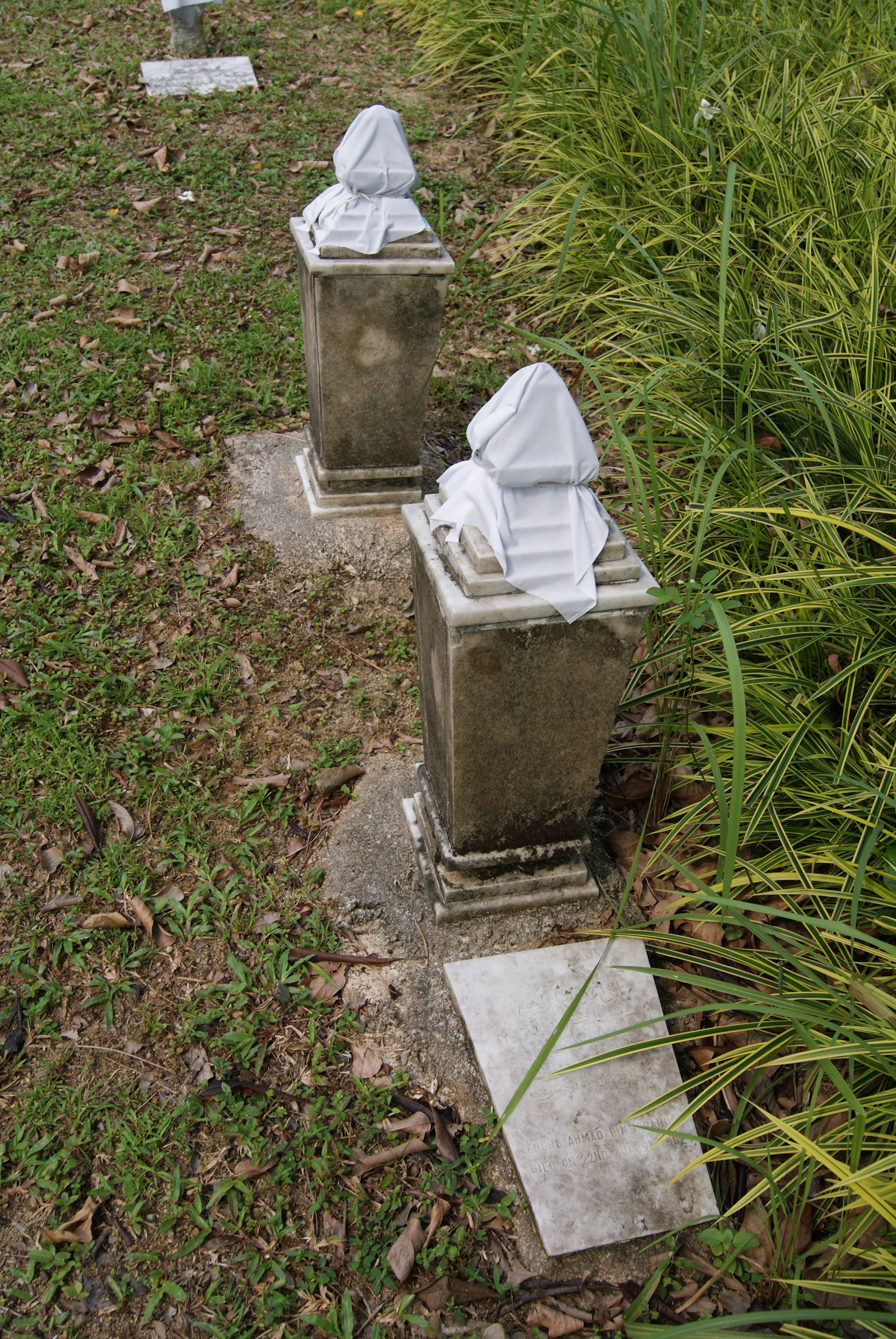
Gravestone of Ahmad Ibrahim

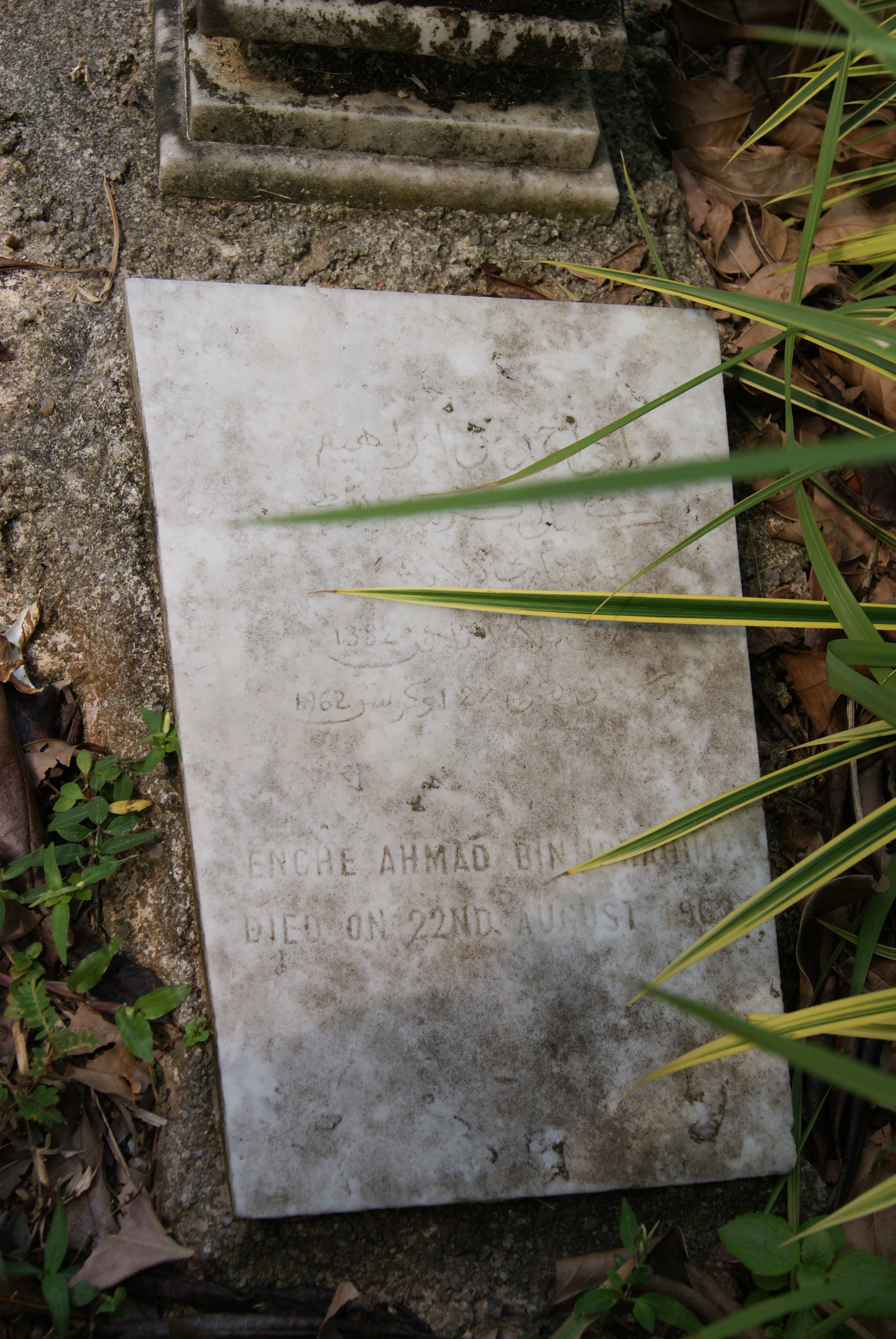
Close-up Gravestone of Ahmad Ibrahim

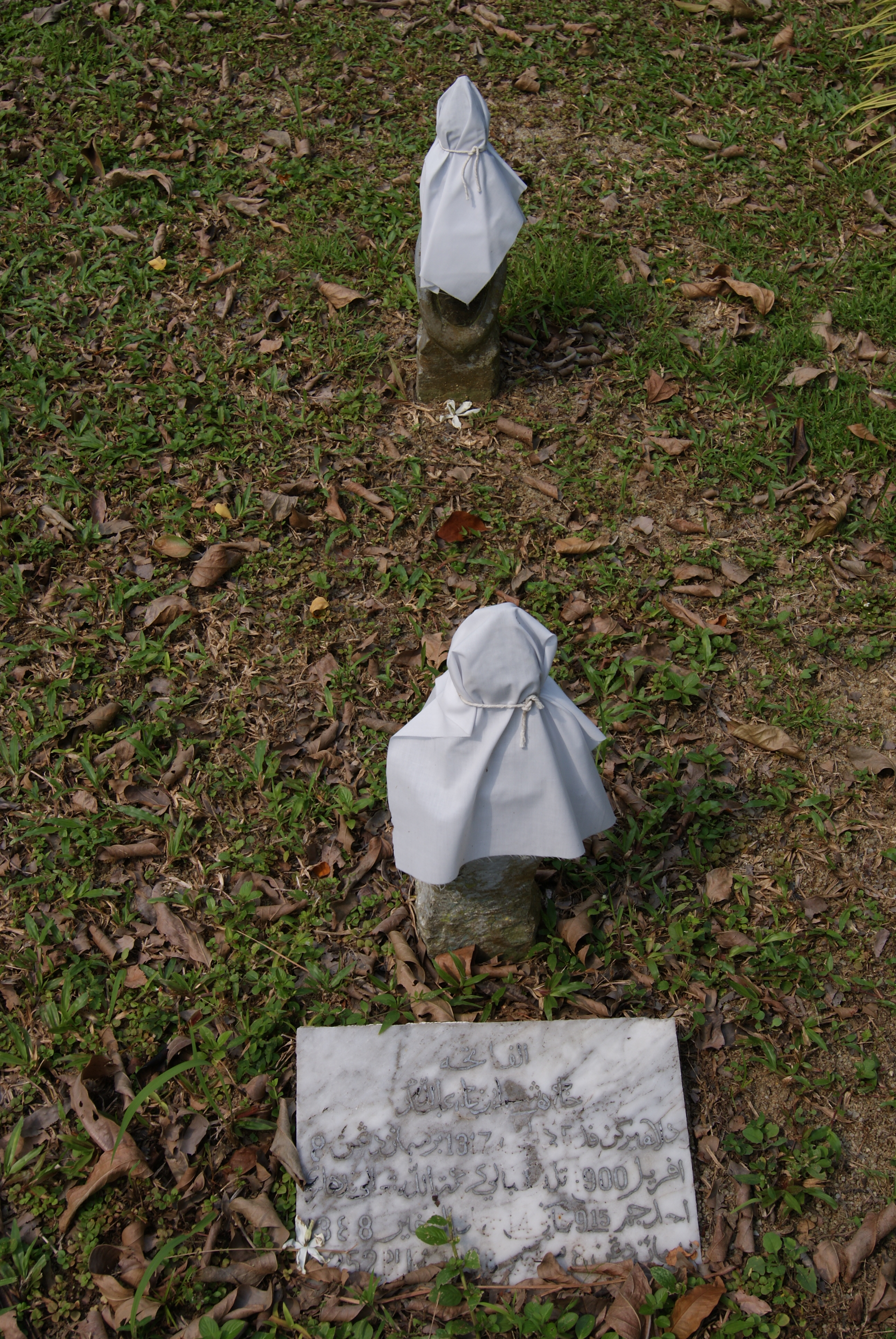
Gravestone of Haji Hashim Haji Abdullah

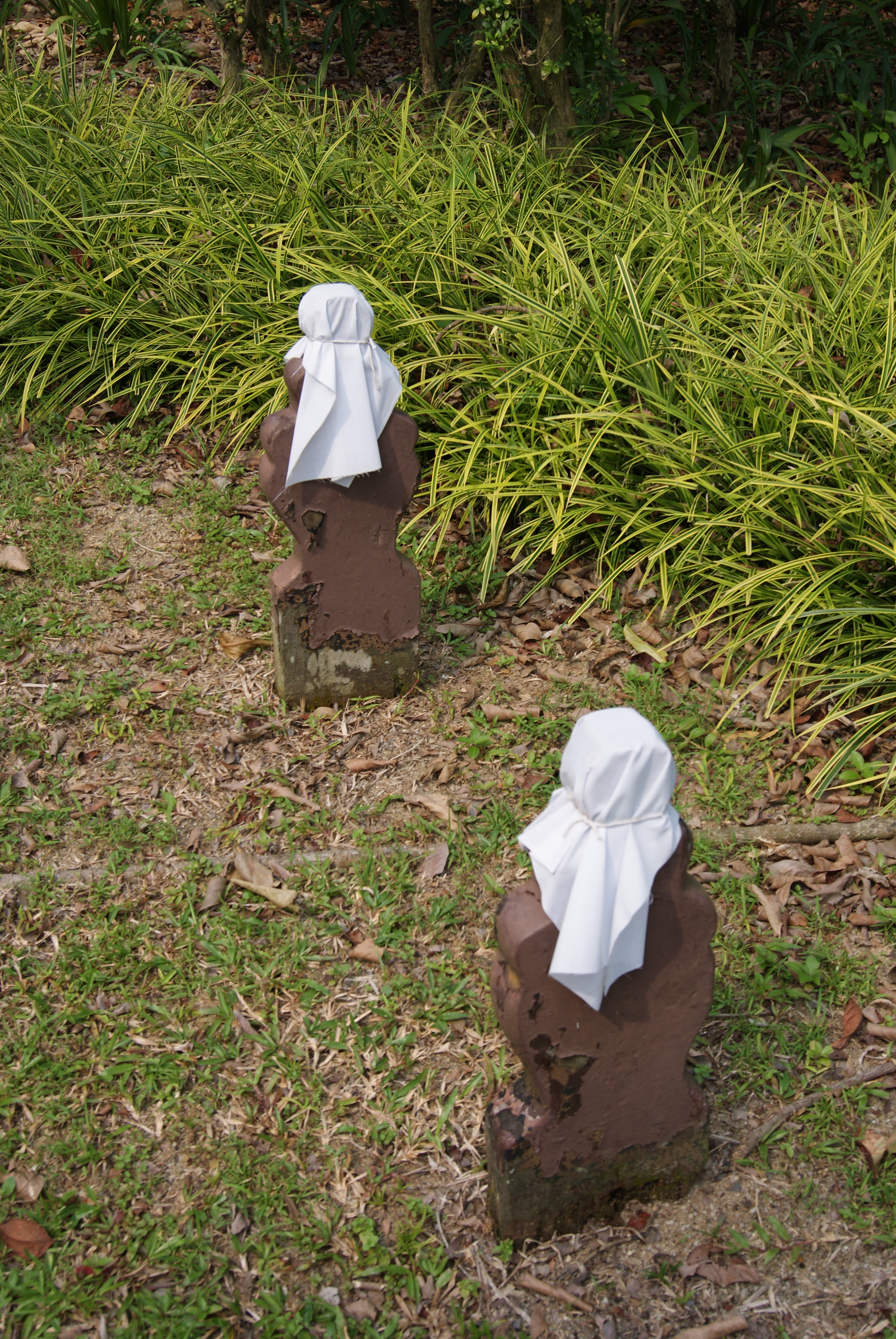
Gravestone of Zahara binte Noor Mohamed

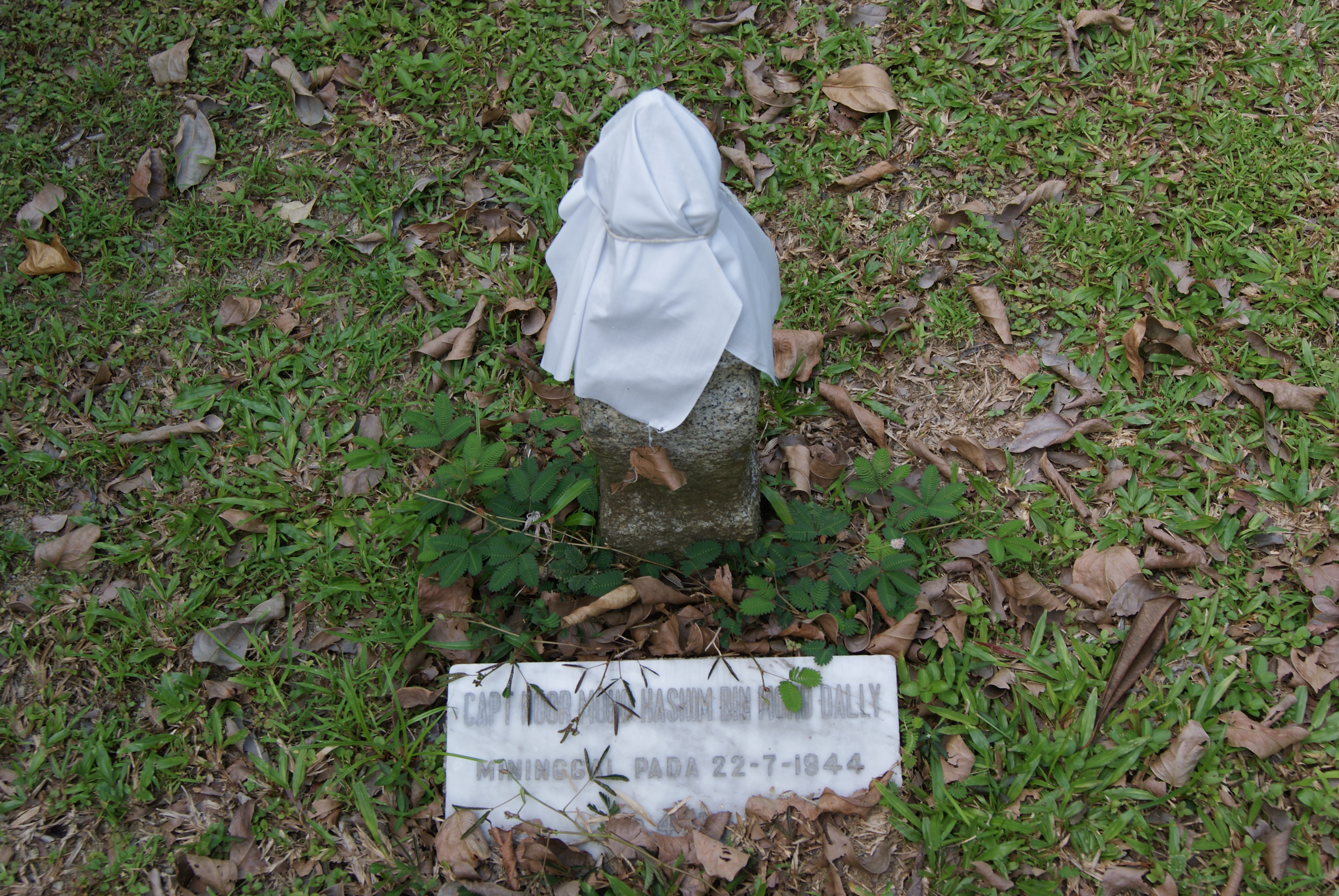
Gravestone of Captain Noor Mohamed Hashim bin Mohamed Dally
