= Blue Horse =

Blue Horse or Blue Horses may refer to:

== Animals ==
- Grullo, a blue dun horse coat color
- Blue roan horse coat color
- Neela (horse), a horse belonging to Guru Gobind Singh, the tenth Sikh guru

== People ==
- Blue Horse (Lakota leader), Oglala Lakota leader, signatory to the 1868 Treaty of Fort Laramie

== Arts and entertainment ==
- Bleu Horses, a herd of sculptured steel horses by Jim Dolan
- Blue Horses or Die grossen blauen Pferde (The Large Blue Horses), a 1911 painting by Franz Marc
- Little Blue Horse, or Blaues Pferdchen, a 1912 painting by Franz Marc
- Blue Mustang, a statue at Denver International Airport, Colorado, U.S.
- Blue Horse (album), a 2000 album by the Be Good Tanyas
- The Bluehorses, a Celtic rock band from Cardiff, Wales
- The Blue Horse, a 2009 film starring Antonie Kamerling

== See also ==
- Blue Horsehead Nebula (IC 4592)
- Blue Peter (disambiguation), various meanings, including horses
- Brown Bear, Brown Bear, What Do You See?, which references a blue horse
- Rainbow Dash, a fictional blue flying pony/horse
