= H. A. L. Fisher =

British historian and politician (1865–1940)

The Right Honourable H. A. L. Fisher OM FRS FBA
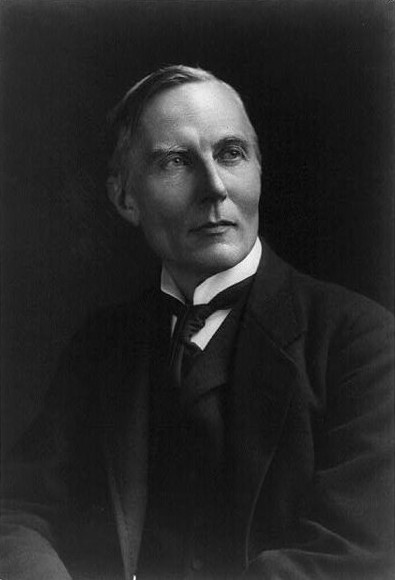

Member of Parliament for Sheffield Hallam
- In office 23 December 1916 – 14 December 1918
- Preceded by: Charles Stuart-Wortley
- Succeeded by: Douglas Vickers

President of the Board of Education
- In office 10 December 1916 – 19 October 1922
- Monarch: George V
- Prime Minister: David Lloyd George
- Preceded by: The Marquess of Crewe
- Succeeded by: E. F. L. Wood

Personal details
- Born: Herbert Albert Laurens Fisher; 21 March 1865 London, England
- Died: 18 April 1940 (aged 75) London, England
- Party: Liberal
- Spouse: Lettice Fisher (1875–1956)
- Relatives: Herbert William Fisher (father); Florence Henrietta Fisher (sister); Edmund Fisher (brother); William Wordsworth Fisher (brother); Charles Dennis Fisher (brother); Edwin Fisher (brother); Mary Bennett (daughter)
- Education: New College, Oxford

Herbert Albert Laurens Fisher OM PC FRS FBA (21 March 1865 – 18 April 1940) was an English historian, educator, and Liberal politician. He served as President of the Board of Education in David Lloyd George's 1916 to 1922 coalition government.

== Background and education ==
Fisher was born on 21 March 1865, in London, the eldest son of Herbert William Fisher (1826–1903), author of Considerations on the Origin of the American War and his wife Mary Louisa Jackson (1841–1916). His sister Adeline Maria Fisher was the first wife of the composer Ralph Vaughan Williams, another sister Florence Henrietta Fisher married both Frederic William Maitland and Sir Francis Darwin. His sister Cordelia Fisher married the author, critic and journalist Richard Curle and was the mother of the academic Adam Curle. Fisher was a first cousin of Virginia Woolf and her sister Vanessa Bell (the children of his mother's sister Julia). He was educated at Winchester and New College, Oxford, where he graduated with a first class degree in 1888 and was awarded a fellowship.

== Career ==
Fisher was a tutor in modern history at the University of Oxford. His publications include Bonapartism (1908), The Republican Tradition in Europe (1911) and Napoleon (1913). In September 1912, he was appointed (with Lord Islington, Lord Ronaldshay, Justice Abdur Rahim, and others) as a member of the Royal Commission on the Public Services in India of 1912–1915. Between 1913 and 1917, he was Vice-Chancellor of the University of Sheffield.

In December 1916 Fisher was elected Member of Parliament for Sheffield Hallam and joined the government of David Lloyd George as President of the Board of Education. He was sworn of the Privy Council the same month. In this post he was instrumental in the formulation of the Education Act 1918, which made school attendance compulsory for children up to the age of 14. Fisher was also responsible for the School Teachers (Superannuation) Act 1918, which provided pension provision for all teachers. While a member of the Privy Council Fisher participated in discussions concerning the British governments response to the Irish independence movement.

In 1918, he became MP for the Combined English Universities.

Fisher resigned his seat in parliament through appointment as Steward of the Chiltern Hundreds on 15 February 1926, retiring from politics to take up the post of warden of New College, Oxford, which he held until his death. There he published a three-volume History of Europe (ISBN 0-00-636506-X) in 1935. He served on the British Academy, the British Museum, the Rhodes Trustees, the National Trust, the Governing Body of Winchester, the London Library and the BBC. He was awarded the 1927 James Tait Black Memorial Prize for his biography James Bryce, Viscount Bryce of Dechmont, O.M. and received the Order of Merit in 1937.

In 1939, he was appointed first Chairman of the Appellate Tribunal for Conscientious Objectors in England and Wales.

Fisher died in St Thomas's Hospital, London, on 18 April 1940, aged 75, after having been knocked down by a lorry and seriously injured the previous week, while on his way to sit on a Conscientious Objectors' Tribunal during the blackout. Some of his possessions, including his library and some of his clothing, remained at New College.

In 1943, Operation Mincemeat, a British Intelligence operation to deceive enemy forces, undertook the invention of a false Royal Marines officer, whose body was to be dropped at sea in the hope the false intelligence it carried would be believed. As the fictitious Major Martin was to be a man of some means, he required quality underwear, but with rationing this was difficult to obtain, and the intelligence officers were unwilling to donate their own. Fisher's was obtained, and the corpse used in the deception, dressed in Fisher's quality woollen underpants, succeeded in misleading German Intelligence.

== Family ==
Fisher married the economist and historian Lettice Ilbert (1875–1956) in 1899. Their only child was the British academic Mary Bennett. She was interviewed, in October 1974, about her parents, by the historian, Brian Harrison, as part of the Suffrage Interviews project, titled Oral evidence on the suffragette and suffragist movements: the Brian Harrison interviews. Bennett talks about Fisher's support for his wife, and their shared interests in Oxford, Suffragism and Liberal politics, as well as their friendship with Gilbert Murray and Sir Lady Murray.

== Portraits ==
A portrait drawing of Fisher by Catharine Dodgson and an oil portrait by William Nicholson (artist) hang at New College, Oxford. The college also possess a conversation piece by Berthe Noufflard of Fisher, Lettice Ilbert, and Mary Bennett.

== See also ==
- Frederic William Maitland
- Henry James Sumner Maine
- Paul Vinogradoff
- Liberalism in the United Kingdom

== Works ==
- The Medieval Empire, Vol. 2, Macmillan & Co., 1898.
- Studies in Napoleonic Statesmanship: Germany, Oxford: Clarendon Press, 1903.
- The History of England, from the Accession of Henry VII to the Death of Henry VIII, 1485–1547, Longmans, Green & Co., 1906.
- Bonapartism; Six Lectures Delivered in the University of London, Oxford : Clarendon Press, 1908.
- The Republican Tradition in Europe, Methuen & Co., 1911.
- Napoleon. H. Holt and Company. 1913. [1st Pub. 1912].
- Committee on Alleged German Outrages (James Bryce; F. Pollock; Edward Clarke; Kenelm Edward Digby; Alfred Hopkinson; H. A. L. Fisher; Harold Cox) (1915). Report of the Committee on Alleged German Outrages Appointed by His Britannic Majesty's Government and Presided over by The Right Hon. Viscount Bryce, O.M., &c. New York: Macmillan Company – via Internet Archive.
- Studies in History and Politics, Oxford : The Clarendon Press, 1920.
- The Common Weal, Oxford: The Clarendon Press, 1924.
- James Bryce. Vol. 1. London: Macmillan. 1927 – via Internet Archive.
- Our New Religion, Ernest Benn, 1929. An examination of Christian Science.
- A History of Europe. Vol. 1. London: Eyre & Spottiswoode. 1935 – via Internet Archive. volume 2;

=== Articles ===
- "Fustel de Coulanges", The English Historical Review, Vol. V, 1890.
- "The Codes" in The Cambridge Modern History, vol. ix, Cambridge: University Press, 1906.
- "The Political Writings of Rousseau", The Edinburgh Review, Vol. CCXXIV, N°. 457, July 1916.
- "The Whig Historians", in Proceedings of the British Academy, n. 14, 1928.
- "A Universal Historian" in The Nineteenth Century and After, vol. 116, no. 694, December, London: Constable, 1934.

=== Pamphlets ===
- The Value of Small States, Oxford Pamphlets, N°. 17, Oxford University Press, 1914.
- The British Share in the War, T. Nelson & Sons, 1915.
- Political Prophecies. An Address to the Edinburg Philosophical Society Delivered Nov. 5, 1918, Oxford: Clarendon Press, 1919.
- The Place of the University in National Life, Oxford University Press, 1919.
- Paul Valéry, Oxford, The Clarendon Press, 1927.
- What to Read on Citizenship, Leeds, Jowett & Sowry Ltd., 1928.

Parliament of the United Kingdom
Preceded by Charles Stuart-Wortley	Member of Parliament for Sheffield Hallam; 1916–1918	Succeeded by Douglas Vickers
New constituency	Member of Parliament for Combined English Universities; 1918–1926; With: Sir Martin Conway	Succeeded by Sir Martin Conway; Sir Alfred Hopkinson
Political offices
Preceded by The Marquess of Crewe	President of the Board of Education; 1916–1922	Succeeded by Hon. E. F. L. Wood
Academic offices
Preceded by Charles Eliot	Vice-Chancellor of the University of Sheffield; 1913–1917	Succeeded by William Ripper
