= Edmund Fisher (architect) =

British architect (1872–1918)

- Born: 13 January 1872; Kensington, England
- Died: 31 March 1918 (aged 46)
- Occupation: Architect

Edmund Montagu Prinsep Fisher (13 January 1872 – 31 March 1918) was a British architect, the son of historian Herbert William Fisher. He died following service in France during World War I.

== Biography ==
Fisher was born on 13 January 1872 in Onslow Square, Kensington, Middlesex, England, the sixth of the eleven children of Herbert William Fisher (1826–1903) and his wife Mary Louisa (née Jackson) (1841–1916). His siblings included: H. A. L. Fisher, historian and Minister of Education; Admiral Sir William Wordsworth Fisher, Commander-in-Chief of the Mediterranean Fleet; Florence Henrietta, Lady Darwin, playwright and wife of Sir Francis Darwin (son of Charles Darwin); and Adeline Vaughan Williams, wife of English composer Ralph Vaughan Williams.

He was educated at Haileybury and trained as an architect in the office of Basil Champneys in London. His distinctive architectural style showed a "singular talent for making his houses appear to grow out of the ground as natural parts of the surrounding scenery." Much of his work was domestic, but he also designed more than twenty schools in Berkshire, including Wescott School and Alwyn County Infants' School, Maidenhead (demolished in 1997) He also designed Wych Cross Place, the residence of his father-in-law Douglas Freshfield, during the early 1900s. His more prominent works include the Maitland Building (1910–1911) and Hall (1912–1913) at Somerville College, Oxford, described as "unassertive but admirable", and the Anglican Church of the Holy Trinity in Rome (now demolished).

== War service and death ==
At the outbreak of World War I he was too old for active service, but he spent the summer of 1915 working as an orderly in the Hôpital Temporaire d'Arc-en-Barrois. The hospital had been set up in December 1914 as a temporary evacuation hospital for the French Army, and Fisher helped with X-ray work. He went on to complete his training for the Royal Field Artillery and was accepted for active service from 5 June 1917, serving in the fighting in the Ypres Salient and the Battle of Cambrai. He served as Second Lieutenant in the 36th Division (Ulster or Irish Division), but suffered appendicitis on 17 January 1918 and was invalided home. He died of peritonitis on Easter Sunday 1918 and was buried in Brockenhurst (St Nicholas) churchyard.

== Personal life ==
On 6 June 1899 he married Janie Magdalene Freshfield (20 September 1875 – c. 1964), daughter of Douglas Freshfield, and they had seven children. Fisher was keen on country pursuits, and was also an admirable judge of painting and porcelain.

== Obituary ==
His obituary in The Times concludes

In conversation he was pithy and humorous, in judgment always independent, in observation alert. The war has claimed no gentler or more spirited victim.
