= Charles Dennis Fisher =

British academic (1877–1916)

Personal information
- Full name: Charles Dennis Fisher
- Born: 19 June 1877; Blatchington Court, Blatchington, Sussex, England
- Died: 31 May 1916 (aged 38); HMS Invincible, North Sea
- Batting: Right-handed
- Bowling: Right-arm off-break

Domestic team information
- Years: Team
- 1898–1903: Sussex
- 1899–1900: Oxford University
- 1903: MCC
- FC debut: 25 July 1898 Sussex v Middlesex
- Last FC: 25 June 1903 Sussex v Oxford University

Career statistics
Competition	First-class
Matches	21
Runs scored	429
Batting average	13.40
100s/50s	0/1
Top score	80
Balls bowled	436
Wickets	8
Bowling average	30.25
5 wickets in innings	0
10 wickets in match	0
Best bowling	2/8
Catches/stumpings	7/–
- Source: CricketArchive, 3 December 2023

Charles Dennis Fisher (19 June 1877 – 31 May 1916) was a British academic, the son of historian Herbert William Fisher. He died in the Battle of Jutland during World War I.

== Biography ==
Fisher was born on 19 June 1877 in Blatchington Court, Blatchington, Sussex, England, and baptised in East Blatchington on 4 August 1877. He was ninth of the eleven children of Herbert William Fisher (1826–1903) and his wife Mary Louisa (née Jackson) (1841–1916). His siblings included: H. A. L. Fisher, historian and Minister of Education; Admiral Sir William Wordsworth Fisher, Commander-in-Chief of the Mediterranean Fleet; Florence Henrietta, Lady Darwin, playwright and wife of Sir Francis Darwin (son of Charles Darwin); and Adeline Vaughan Williams, wife of English composer Ralph Vaughan Williams. He was also the brother of Cordelia Curle (née Fisher), who was the wife of the author, critic and journalist Richard Curle and the mother of the academic Adam Curle.

Fisher was educated at Westminster School, matriculating to Christ Church, Oxford in 1896, where he gained his B.A. in 1900 and his M.A. in 1903. A fine cricketer, he represented Sussex County Cricket Club since 1898 and he played in the University eleven in 1899 and 1900. He was elected Tutor in Christ Church in 1903 and served as Senior Censor from 1910 to 1914, described as one of Oxford's "most prominent members of its educational staff".

Fond of exercise, he liked hiking through the Austrian Alps and also undertook long walking tours through Italy with the aim of better appreciating the Roman historian Cornelius Tacitus. He had already edited two of Tacitus's works, his Annals and Histories, for the Clarendon Press, and his texts were described as "models of sense and clearness"; he was following this by writing a commentary on the Histories as a companion to Henry Furneaux's edition of the Annals.

At the start of World War I in 1914 he learnt to drive, joined the Royal Army Medical Corps Motor Ambulance and served on the Western Front as orderly and interpreter, distinguishing himself for bravery under fire. He then underwent a short period of training, and joined the Royal Navy in August 1915. He was lieutenant in the Royal Naval Volunteer Reserve, and was serving on HMS Invincible when she was sunk in the Battle of Jutland on 31 May 1916 with the loss of 1026 lives.

The biographer of his sister Adeline's husband describes Charles Fisher as "brilliant and most dashing of Adeline's brothers" and tells how his death was "a blow from which she never recovered". An obituary in The Times described him as a "lovable man, big, handsome, manly, noble", with "penetrating judgment" and "refreshing frankness", who "hated shams, and knew a good man when he saw him". It concludes, "His college mourns in him one of the best she has known. If it had not been for the existing necessity of holy orders, it is in Charles Fisher that Christ Church would naturally have expected to find its next Dean."

== Cricket career ==
Fisher played first-class cricket from 1898 to 1903, making 21 appearances, mainly for Sussex and also for Oxford University Cricket Club and Marylebone Cricket Club. He was a righthanded batsman who bowled right arm medium pace and off break. He scored 429 career runs with a highest score of 80, against Worcestershire at Hove in 1901, and took eight career wickets with a best performance of two for 8.

In his Wisden obituary, Fisher was described as 6 ft. 3in. in height and "a safe and steady batsman". He was a consistent bowler who could maintain a good length in his deliveries. At Westminster, he was in the school's first eleven for the four years 1893 to 1896 and captain in the last three. He obtained his Blue at Oxford in 1900 and played in the University Match that year.
