= Gerald Shove =

British economist

Frank Gerald Shove
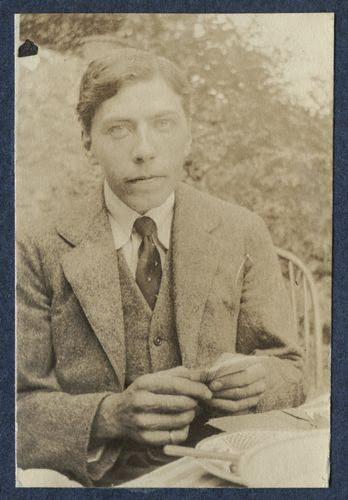
- Gerald Shove in 1917.
- Born: 1887; Ospringe, Kent, England
- Died: 11 August 1947 (aged 59–60); Old Hunstanton, Norfolk, England

Academic background
- Influences: Alfred Marshall

Academic work
- Institutions: King's College, Cambridge

Gerald Frank Shove (November 1887 – 11 August 1947) was a British economist. He was involved in the economics debates in Cambridge in the 1920s and 1930s.

== Biography ==
Shove was born in Faversham, Kent, the son of Herbert Samuel Shove and his wife Bertha Millen. His younger brother was the Olympic rower Ralph Shove.

He was educated at Uppingham School and King's College, Cambridge, where he became a member of the Cambridge Apostles.

He married in 1915 Fredegond Maitland, daughter of historian Frederic William Maitland and his wife the playwright Florence Henrietta Fisher. In World War I he was a conscientious objector, like many others in the Bloomsbury Group, of which he was a member; he worked as a poultry keeper at Garsington, the home of Lady Ottoline Morrell.

He initially coached economics students and later gained a lecturing post. He became a Fellow of King's College in 1926 and later rose to Reader in Economics. He was involved in the economics debates in Cambridge in the 1920 and 30s. His interests included diminishing returns, imperfect competition and developing tools to deal with complexity.

He died at Old Hunstanton and was buried at the Parish of the Ascension Burial Ground in Cambridge; his wife Fredegond was also interred in the same burial plot. After his death all his economic notes were destroyed.

== Publications ==
- "Varying Costs and Marginal Net Products," Economic Journal, 38 (150) pp. 258–266, 1928
- "Increasing Returns and the Representative Firm", Economic Journal, 40 (157), 1930
- "The Place of Marshall's Principles in the Development of Economic Theory", EJ, 1942.
- "Mrs Robinson on Marxian Economics", EJ, 1944.
