= Blue Peter (disambiguation) =

Blue Peter is a British children's television programme.

Blue Peter also may refer to:

== Music ==
- Blue Peter (band), Canadian synthpop band
- "Blue Peter" (instrumental), 1979 release of the Blue Peter programme's theme tune by Mike Oldfield
- Blu Peter or Peter Harris (born 1961), British music producer

== Film ==
- The Blue Peter (1928 film), British silent film
- The Blue Peter (1955 film), British naval film

== Other uses ==
- Blue Peter (British horse) (born 1936)
- Blue Peter (American horse) (born 1946)
- Blue Peter Book Award, literary awards for children's books
- The Blue Peter (magazine), a British sea travel monthly, with artwork by Jack Spurling
- Blue Peter, international maritime signal flag meaning "P" or "outward bound"
- Locomotive LNER Peppercorn Class A2 60532 Blue Peter
