= Richard Curle =

Scottish author, critic and journalist

- Born: 1883; Melrose, Scottish Borders, Scotland
- Died: 1968 (aged 84)
- Education: Wellington College
- Occupations: Author, critic and journalist
- Spouse: Cordelia Curle (née Fisher)
- Children: Adam Curle

Richard Curle (1883–1968) was a Scottish author, critic, and journalist. He was a friend of the novelist Joseph Conrad, who was also the subject of several of his critical works.

Conrad and Curle became friends in the 1910s, becoming especially close in Conrad's last years, and following Conrad's death in 1924 Curle was an executor of his estate. Curle's first book on Conrad, Joseph Conrad: A Study, was published in 1914; it was followed by Joseph Conrad's Last Day (privately published in 1924) and The Last Twelve Years of Joseph Conrad (1928), as well as a number of reviews and magazine articles.

Curle's other works included the travel book Into the East (1923), based on his experiences in Asia, the mystery novels Corruption (1933) and Who Goes Home? (1935), and Characters of Dostoevsky (1950), a study of the work of Fyodor Dostoevsky.

== Early life and career ==
Richard Henry Parnell Curle was born in Melrose, Scotland in 1883, the third of eleven children. His father was a landowner and lawyer.

Curle attended Wellington College and subsequently worked as a columnist for the Daily Mail. He worked for the publisher Kegan Paul from 1905, and published several essays on George Meredith.

== Life and relationship with Joseph Conrad ==
=== 1912–1923 ===
Curle first met Joseph Conrad in November 1912. He had written an article on Conrad's work, focusing in particular on Nostromo, for that month's issue of Rhythm, which was shown to Conrad by Edward Garnett. He had also, the previous year, reviewed Conrad's Under Western Eyes for The Manchester Guardian, querying Conrad's turn to modernism and noting similarities with Fyodor Dostoevsky's Crime and Punishment.

After they met at a lunch hosted by Garnett at the Mont Blanc Restaurant, they entered into a mutually beneficial relationship in which Curle would write extensively about Conrad's work. In July 1913 Conrad wrote to Curle to express his support for Curle's then-forthcoming study of Conrad's work, saying that he had asked Doubleday, his American publisher, to consider publishing Curle's study, in order that Curle might be able to publish studies of other European authors in the United States. Conrad viewed Curle's study as a work that would introduce him to the American market, without pigeonholing him as a mere writer of nautical fiction. Curle, for his part, benefited financially from the works he published based on the access Conrad granted him.

Along with Francis Warrington Dawson, Curle supplanted Ford Madox Ford as a member of the circle surrounding Conrad. While Conrad had seen Ford, who came to know him before his literary success, as an equal, he saw Curle, who he met only after achieving fame, as more of a disciple. Conrad came to see Curle as a James Boswell to his Samuel Johnson. Conrad's biographer Frederick R. Karl identifies Curle as one of several "substitute 'sons'" who gathered around Conrad in the 1910s, also including Dawson, Hugh Walpole and Georges Jean-Aubry. Alongside Walpole and Jean-Aubry, Curle was one of a number of younger men who wrote favourably about their friend Conrad. Curle would become a constant companion to Conrad in his later years. Conrad ridiculed Curle's book collecting, but nonetheless indulged him by providing him with signed first editions. Conrad's son John Conrad describes his father's growing closeness with Curle as occurring simultaneously with the decline of his friendship with Garnett, and argues that Curle was not simply a reader and advisor to Conrad but was also valued for his observations on his travels and "his ability to create a word-picture of a place or situation". The younger Conrad attests that "Dick, as we called him, became part of the family and was a frequent and very welcome visitor whenever he was in England", and came to be his father's closest friend. Karl described Curle as "stable, old-fashioned in his attitudes, very much a preserver of the proprieties, and a steadying force upon Conrad."

Curle's wife, Cordelia Curle (née Fisher), was the sister of the historian H. A. L. Fisher, the cricketer and academic Charles Dennis Fisher, the naval officer William Wordsworth Fisher, the banker Edwin Fisher, and Adeline Vaughan Williams, the wife of the composer Ralph Vaughan Williams. Her other relatives included the historian Frederic William Maitland, the photographer Julia Margaret Cameron, the author Virginia Woolf, and the artist Vanessa Bell. Cordelia was also close to Conrad, especially in the earlier years of her marriage. Their son Adam Curle was born in 1916. Richard was not a frequent presence in Adam's childhood; Adam did not meet his father until he was three years old. Adam Curle would later become Director of Harvard University's Centre for Studies in Education and Development, and the United Kingdom's first Professor of Peace Studies in the University of Bradford's Department of Peace Studies.

Curle spent the years 1916–18 working as a journalist in South Africa. Conrad dedicated his novel The Arrow of Gold (1919) to him. He returned to the Daily Mail in the late 1910s as an assistant editor and columnist, and lived with Cordelia and Adam, then travelled to Burma in 1920 to take up the editorship of The Rangoon Times. He would spend much of 1920 in Burma and the Malay States. He and Cordelia divorced in 1922.

Curle played the role of a go-between in negotiations with newspapers for the publication of Conrad's work. He was involved in the collation of Conrad's Notes on Life and Letters (1921). Curle played a greater role in Conrad's business affairs from 1922. Conrad wrote the preface to Curle's 1923 book of essays, Into the East. The preface also appeared in Conrad's posthumous Last Essays. In it, Conrad laments the passing of an earlier form of travel and its replacement by tourism; the preface does not mention Curle by name.

=== Conrad's death and thereafter ===
Curle spent time with Conrad in the days immediately before the latter's death. On 2 August 1924 they discussed Conrad's unfinished novel Suspense and visited a house he was considering renting; when Conrad experienced chest pains Curle called him a doctor. Neither doctor who attended Conrad believed he was seriously ill; he died, however, in the morning of 3 August. Curle attended his funeral four days later.

Along with Ralph Wedgwood, Curle was executor of Conrad's estate until 1944, when responsibility was transferred to John Conrad and the law firm Withers. In this capacity he prepared Suspense for its 1925 publication, and privately published Conrad's Congo diaries and the notes Conrad had inscribed in Curle's copies of his works. Along with Jean-Aubry, Curle was pivotal in maintaining Conrad's reputation after his death, including when his books went out of print. Shortly after Conrad's death Curle, who was then working for the Daily Mail, arranged for short works by Conrad to appear in that newspaper, as well as in The Times, The Forum, The Blue Peter and The Yale Review. Curle edited and introduced Conrad's Last Essays (1926), a posthumous collection of articles. Curle viewed Last Essays as a companion piece to Notes on Life and Letters. Curle assisted Jessie Conrad with the sale of her late husband's library; most of his own Conrad collection was sold at auction in 1927. He later grew apart from Jessie and saw her as extravagant, but remained close to John Conrad and corresponded with him extensively. Wedgwood was another close friend of Curle's, as was his daughter, the historian Veronica Wedgwood.

In the 1930s Curle spent much of his time in the Americas, returning to England following the outbreak of World War II. Later in life he collected books on zoology and specialised in entomology, becoming a Fellow of the Royal Entomological Society in 1947. Curle encouraged the writing of Joseph Conrad: Times Remembered (1981), an account by the author's son John Conrad, and the younger Conrad dedicated the book to Curle. A wanderer for most of his life, he settled down in Somerset in the last 25 years of his life. Later in life, his son recalled, Curle was haunted by a sense of failure and the fact that his work on topics other than Conrad was little-known.

Tom Woodhouse described Curle as a "larger-than-life" figure with a reputation as a womaniser. Adam Curle remembered his father as a compulsive traveller, "certainly not made for family life," and suffering from occasional fits of melancholy, guilt and bad temper, but also loyal, courteous and possessed of a "ribald sense of the ludicrous". He attributed his father's closeness to Conrad to their shared "sense of the inwardness of things, of mystery, of the strange hidden behind the banal". He described him as closer to "a delightful uncle who would periodically descend and whisk me off" than a father in his early life, but noted that they became closer in his adulthood. Nonetheless, in Adam Curle's account his father's relationship with him was less important to him than his friendships with Wedgwood and especially with Conrad.

== Works on Conrad ==
Joseph Conrad: A Study (1914), the first of Curle's three books on Conrad, was the first book-length study of the author. The book is organised thematically and covers the entire range of Conrad's work. It received several negative reviews, but had Conrad's support. Conrad hoped that the book, along with his own autobiography A Personal Record, would enhance his reputation and cultivate demand for a Uniform Edition of his works. Curle considered the book more accurate than Ford Madox Ford's Joseph Conrad: A Personal Remembrance (1924). Józef Retinger, in turn, criticised Curle's account in his own study of Conrad.

Between 1922 and 1927 Curle wrote a number of pieces about Conrad for the travel magazine The Blue Peter. The essay "Joseph Conrad in the East" (1922), which examined the extent to which the representations of Asia in Conrad's work were based on his personal experiences, was met initially with hostility from Conrad, who told Curle he had deliberately avoided foregrounding the autobiographical elements of his works. Conrad later relented, however, and suggested revisions for the piece in the hope it would aid in building his reputation in the United States, most of which Curle accepted. The two authors corresponded extensively over the article, with Curle at one point proposing it be scrapped. In 1923 they again corresponded over an article Curle was writing for The Times Literary Supplement (TLS) on the Uniform Edition of Conrad's novels, in which, Conrad thought, Curle failed to give a sense of the atmosphere of the works, focusing instead on historical details. Throughout his letters to Curle on both articles, Conrad expressed a desire to avoid being read as an author of "exotic" works or nautical narratives, both for commercial reasons and because he saw his work as more complex than those categories indicated, and saw Curle's articles as an opportunity to develop a different reputation. When Frank Swettenham responded to Curle's TLS article, arguing that parts of Conrad's Lord Jim were based on the 1880 abandonment of the SS Jeddah by its crew, Conrad disagreed with parts of Swettenham's argument, but had Curle publish a reply, and several further responses, rather than writing a rebuttal himself.

Curle reviewed Conrad's The Rover (1923) in the Daily Mail. Soon after Conrad's death in 1924, Curle privately published the book Joseph Conrad's Last Day. Curle wrote an introduction for Conrad's posthumous novel Suspense (1925), the publication of which he oversaw. He also supplied an introduction for Jessie Conrad's Joseph Conrad as I Knew Him (1926), and probably assisted her in writing the book.

Joseph Conrad's Last Day was incorporated as the final chapter in Curle's The Last Twelve Years of Joseph Conrad (1928). Rather than offering a comprehensive account of the final years of Conrad's life, the book sought to supplement what was already common knowledge about Conrad as a man, based primarily on personal recollections supplemented through reference to Conrad's correspondence. As in Joseph Conrad: A Study, its twelve chapters cover themes such as "Conrad as a Friend" and "The Personality of Conrad", and describe the novelist in laudatory terms. The critic Jeffrey Meyers describes the book as "seriously flawed" and lacking objectivity or insight.

Curle also composed Conrad to a Friend: 150 Selected Letters from Joseph Conrad to Richard Curle (1928). Curle sold the rights to the correspondence to the Broadway producer and eccentric Crosby Gaige, who he met on board the RMS Majestic in 1926. On the same voyage Curle met S. N. Behrman, who described Curle's reminiscences of Conrad in his memoirs.

== Other works ==
Curle's other publications include an anonymous book on etiquette, several novels and collections of short stories, works of criticism and travel writing, guides to book collecting and stamp collecting, two psychological studies, and two collections of articles previously published in the Daily Mail. He also edited a volume of the correspondence of Robert Browning and Frances Julia Wedgwood, and compiled a bibliography of publications by the Ray Society.

Curle's Into the East, featuring Conrad's preface, was published in 1923. It included several pieces previously published in The Blue Peter. The book is an account of his travels in Burma and British Malaya, focusing predominantly on the people of the region (both natives and colonists) rather than the natural environment. A review in The New York Times concluded that Curle succeeds "in giving us his own brief reactions to the varied scenes and the actors with a vividness that is compelling and memorable." Richard Niland has suggested that the book is "Conradian" in tone and compared it to Conrad's short story "Youth".

The mystery novel Corruption was published in 1933. Its narrative concerns a United States Secret Service officer who uncovers a murder plot while visiting an old friend. A review in The New York Times described the book's creation of suspense and atmosphere as a success, but described the novel as a failure of literary "craftsmanship" with a climax "so mismanaged and overdone as to approach the ludicrous."

Who Goes Home?, another mystery novel, was published in 1935. Set in an English country house, its plot concerns a charming young man who, over the course of the novel, is revealed to be a threat to the narrator. The New York Times' review praised the novel's "atmosphere of brooding mystery and terror" and described it as "a tense and exciting story." George Orwell reviewed the book in the New English Weekly the following year, noting that Curle "does work up a faint flicker of interest", but criticising his prose, writing "It is amazing that people can go on turning out books year after year and yet continue to write so badly."

Curle's Characters of Dostoevsky, a study of the characters of Fyodor Dostoevsky's four major novels and their psychology, was published in 1950. A. D. Hope, reviewing the study in Meanjin, described it as "first of all a useful book" and characterised Curle's analysis as "sensible and penetrating and well supported with illustration and argument", but accused him, like other critics of Dostoevsky, of having couched his readings "in terms of the very values whose validity the novels place in doubt".

== Death ==
Curle died in 1968, at age 84. Most of his papers are held at Indiana University's Lilly Library.

== Selected works ==
- Aspects of George Meredith (1908)
- Shadows Out of the Crowd (1912)
- Joseph Conrad: A Study (1914)
- Life is a Dream (1914)
- The Echo of Voices... (1917)
- Wanderings: A Book of Travel and Reminiscence (1920)
- Into the East: Notes on Burma and Malaya (1923)
- Joseph Conrad's Last Day (1924)
- The Personality of Joseph Conrad (1925)
- The Last Twelve Years of Joseph Conrad (1928)
- The One and the Other (1928)
- Collecting American First Editions (1930)
- Corruption (1933)
- Caravansary and Conversation (1937)
- Characters of Dostoevsky (1950)
- Atmosphere of Places (1951)
- Joseph Conrad and His Characters (1957)
