= Fredegond Shove =

English poet (1889–1949)

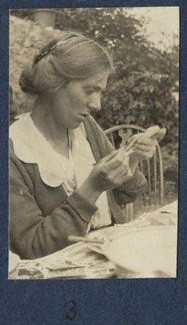
Fredegond Shove, photographed by Lady Ottoline Morrell.

Fredegond Cecily Shove (/ˈfrɛdɪɡɒnd ˈʃoʊv/ FRED-i-gond SHOHV) (née Maitland; 1889–1949) was an English poet. Two collections of her poetry were published in her lifetime, and a small selection also appeared after her death.

== Early life and publications ==
Fredegond Cecily Maitland was the daughter of a legal historian, Frederic William Maitland, and his wife Florence Henrietta Fisher. Her mother was a maternal first cousin to Virginia Woolf and sister of Adeline Maria Fisher, the wife of Ralph Vaughan Williams. Her mother's second marriage to Francis Darwin in 1913 brought her in contact with his extended family. She attended Newnham College in 1910–1913 and during that period also spent time in London with the Vaughan Williams. In 1915 she married the economist Gerald Shove, who like her own family, had links with the Bloomsbury group. As a conscientious objector doing farming as his alternative service, he worked at Garsington Manor near Oxford for most of 1916–1917. The future Juliette Huxley, who was working there as a French tutor, later reminisced: "In those days... I saw a good deal of Fredegond Shove, Gerald's wife, who lived like a Spartan at the Bailiff's Cottage." Their employer, Lady Ottoline Morrell, also remembered Fredegond then as "an enchanting creature, very sensitive, delicate and highly strung, with a fantastic imagination".

In 1918, the Oxford publisher Benjamin Henry Blackwell brought out her first poetry collection, Dreams and Journeys, several poems from which were soon anthologised. One of them, "The Farmer 1917", conjures an evocative rural scene amidst the anguish of war, which suited it for The Paths of Glory (1919), a post-war anthology covering the broader field of poetry written in the period. It was later anthologized in Modern British Poetry (New York 1925), Twentieth Century Verse (Toronto 1945), Men who March away (London 1965) and the Penguin Book of World War 1 Poetry (2006). Another obliquely anti-war poem, "A man dreams that he is the creator", had appeared in Norman Angell's pacifist monthly War and Peace before inclusion in Dreams and Journeys. The following year it appeared in the American anthology The Book of Modern British Verse (Boston, 1919) and translated by Rafael Cansinos-Asséns in the Hispano-American review Cervantes.

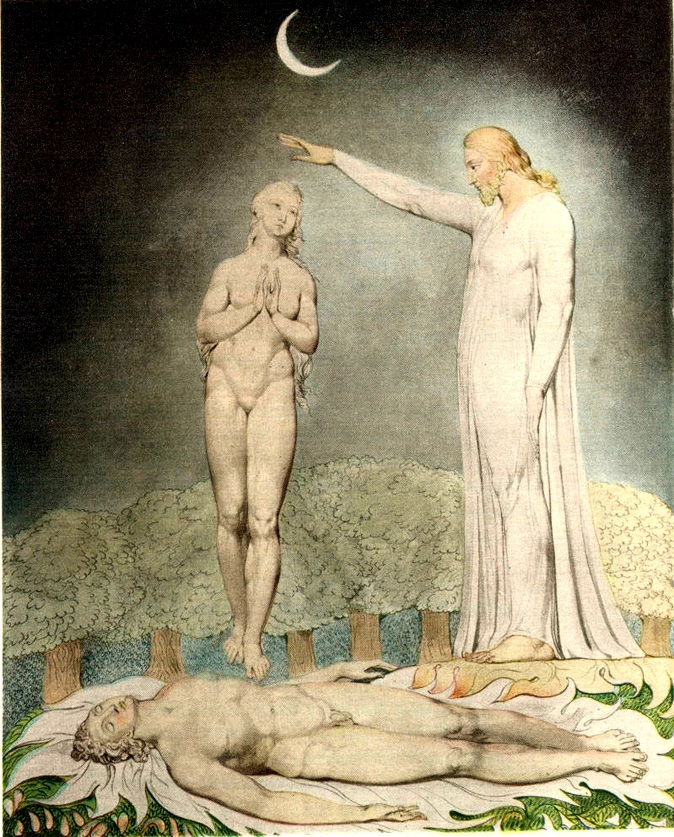
"The spirit trembled and sprang up at the Lord’s word", The New Ghost

The poem in Shove's collection referred to most often was "The New Ghost", a mystical tale of a departing soul met by the Divine in a springtime setting. It has an almost conversational rhythm. It was among four chosen for Georgian Poetry 1918–19, and in 1925 it was set to music by Ralph Vaughan Williams as one of his Four Poems by Fredegond Shove. In typifying the poetic trends of the time, the introduction to An Anthology of Modern Verse (1921) noted "that something like a return to religion is in process." Robert Strachan in his Edinburgh lectures on contemporary writing called it "a very remarkable short poem... unique in modern poetry", Herbert Palmer too identified Fredegond as a religious poet on the strength of "The New Ghost" – "one of the best half dozen poems in the book". It also appeared in The Golden Book of English Poetry 1870–1920, the Anglo-American Home Book of Modern Verse (New York 1925), the Oxford Book of Christian Verse (1940) and Twentieth Century Verse (Toronto 1945). In 1958 it returned in another Anglo-American anthology: Modern Verse in English 1900–1950.

Shove's inclusion in Georgian Poetry as "the first, arguably token, woman" to appear in the series caused some ill will in the poetry politics of the time. She was preferred over candidates who were being urged on the editor as more experienced and progressive, such as Charlotte Mew, Rose Macaulay and Edith Sitwell. Later critics have been unkind about Vaughan Williams's use of her work, speculating that he only set her poems because of their family relationship and describing her as "a wholly unexceptional poet".

Even so, the 1920s for her were a time of popularity and prosperity. Besides the anthology appearances already mentioned, a different selection of five poems appeared in Cambridge Poets 1914–1920, two poems in W H Davies's anthology Shorter Lyrics of the Twentieth Century 1900-1922, and one in Eighty Poems: an anthology (1924). However, the period had started with her mother's death in 1920, after which she became preoccupied with religion and joined into the Catholic Church two years later.

== Later life ==
In 1922 Fredegond Shove’s second collection, Daybreak, was published by the Woolfs from their Hogarth Press, but there is no evidence that its 23 poems had the same impact. Something is there of her earlier manner, which Harold Monro had called "an uncanny sense of the reality beneath fact. Her subliminal is her actual existence." It was for this that Byron Adams, commenting in later times on the religious aspects of her work, described her as a "minor symbolist". Her spiritualised vision is typically manifest in "Revelation":

Near as my hand
The transformation: (time to understand
Is long but never far,
As things desirèd are:)
No iceberg floating at the pole; no mark
Of glittering, perfect consciousness, nor dark
And mystic root of riddles; death nor birth,
Except of heart, when flesh is changed from earth
To heaven involved in it: not at all strange,
Not set beyond the common, human range;
Possible in the steep, quotidian stream,
Possible in a dream;
Achieved when all the energies are still –
Especially the will.

The tentative pointing here to a reality underlying outward appearance has been cited by a later religious commentator as the kind of mystical epiphany found "even in the most ordinary moments of life".

Fredegond Shove's one other book in her lifetime was a study of Christina Rossetti (Cambridge 1931). However, she continued to write poetry throughout her life, publishing selections from time to time. In Atalanta's Garland (1926) there are three poems. Lascelles Abercrombie, one of her associates from Georgian Poetry, asked for previously unpublished work to include in his anthology New English Poems in 1931, and the following year she was asked by Charles du Bos for poems to include in his Catholic review Vigile, for which he provided prose translations.

After her death in 1949, Shove was buried with her husband and other family members in the Ascension Parish Burial Ground in Cambridge. Her sister Ermengarde Maitland (1887–1968) acted as her literary executor and had the poet's brief memoirs of her early years and married life privately published as Fredegond and Gerald Shove (1952). In the introduction to this, she described sorting through the house and finding poems "everywhere: fairly copied in note-books, scribbled on bits of paper, stuffed into bookcases, cupboards and desks – one would not have been surprised to have found them in the oven – literally hundreds of poems."

A selection of 32 poems was published by Cambridge University Press in 1956. Included were some from her two earlier books, a few that had appeared in various places since, and more that were unpublished. In the prefatory note, Ermengarde summarised her sister's account of the interior vision impelling her to write. "She told of her earliest sense of 'the Almighty's sheltering roof tree', of the fear that came to her as she viewed this 'secondary world'. 'I was shocked and sickened at the ways of one world, whilst I clung, ever more secretly, to the faint legacy which the other had left me.' She told also of that day at the age of fourteen 'in the charity of the brown autumn sunlight, I felt myself to be one of those who must try to relate their experiences, and to whom experiences are scenes, colours and sounds always, rather than events or actions.'" It is as faithful a characterisation of her work as any.
