= William Wordsworth Fisher =

Royal Navy admiral (1875–1937)

Admiral Sir William Wordsworth Fisher GCB GCVO
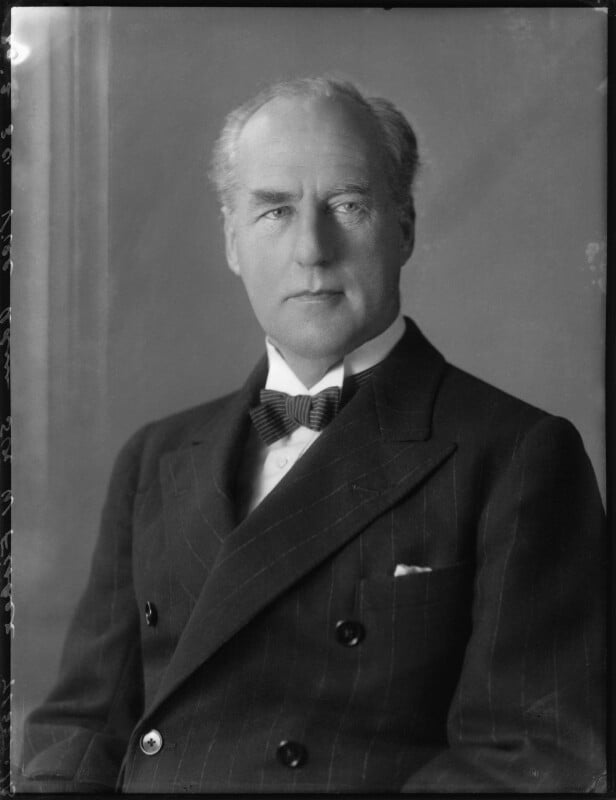
- Fisher in 1930
- Born: 26 March 1875
- Died: 24 June 1937 (aged 62)
- Military career
- Allegiance: United Kingdom
- Branch: Royal Navy
- Rank: Admiral
- Commands: HMS St Vincent; HMS Iron Duke; Mediterranean Fleet; Portsmouth Command
- Conflicts: World War I
- Awards: Knight Grand Cross of the Order of the Bath; Knight Grand Cross of the Royal Victorian Order

Admiral Sir William Wordsworth Fisher GCB GCVO (26 March 1875 – 24 June 1937) was a Royal Navy officer who captained a battleship at the Battle of Jutland and became Commander-in-Chief of the Mediterranean Fleet. Arthur Marder wrote that he was "the outstanding admiral of the inter-war period".

== Naval career ==
Fisher was born on 26 March 1875, at Blatchington in Sussex, the son of historian Herbert William Fisher and his wife Mary Louisa Jackson (1841–1916). He joined the Royal Navy in 1888 and trained in HMS Britannia.

As a midshipman he served in HMS Raleigh, flagship of the Cape of Good Hope and West Africa Squadron, for three years from 1890 to 1893, before joining HMS Calypso in the Training Squadron. After examinations and courses, and now a sub-lieutenant, he joined the protected cruiser HMS Hawke in the Mediterranean Fleet in January 1896. The ship was a byword for smartness. According to Fisher's biographer "she was remembered as the ship whose stream anchor was kept burnished like polished silver". He left her as a lieutenant with highly appreciative reports from his captains and was selected to qualify in gunnery.

He joined the gunnery course, for a first year at the Royal Naval College, Greenwich, on 14 September 1898, along with other lieutenants who were likewise to distinguish themselves in later years:, Frank Larken, Tufton Beamish and Ernest Taylor (like Beamish, later also an MP). The second year of the course was at Whale Island and the third and final year on a gunnery school staff, which for Fisher was to be Whale Island. His joined the modern pre-dreadnought battleship HMS Canopus, as a gunnery lieutenant in Malta in November 1901. In mid-1903 he was again ashore, on the senior staff of the gunnery school Cambridge at Devonport and this was followed, on 1 January 1904, by an appointment as a senior staff officer at Whale Island. This appointment would normally have led to his becoming first lieutenant of Whale Island but Fisher fell out with Captain Percy Scott, the famous gunnery expert then commanding 'The Island'.

Nevertheless, his reputation could weather minor storms, and he was selected by Captain Arthur Leveson, flag captain to Admiral Sir William May, as first and gunnery lieutenant of the new Atlantic Fleet flagship, HMS King Edward VII, joining her in January 1905. He struck up a firm and lasting friendship with Dudley Pound in a busy eighteen months on board, leaving the ship early after selection for early promotion to Commander, donning his 'brass hat' on 30 June 1906, aged 31.

His first appointment with three stripes, in September 1906, was as commander of the pre-dreadnought battleship HMS Albemarle, flagship of Rear-Admiral Atlantic Fleet, soon to be commanded by Captain Robert Falcon Scott and flying the flag of Rear-Admiral John Jellicoe. His success in her led to his joining, in the same role, in June 1908, the new battlecruiser HMS Indomitable, fitting out to take the Prince of Wales to Canada for a seven-day visit. This was soon followed by his becoming flag commander – staff officer – to the Commander-in-Chief Home Fleet, his old chief Admiral Sir William May, flying his flag in the new battleship HMS Dreadnought, where he developed gunnery tactics. When Admiral May was appointed Commander-in-Chief, Plymouth, in the spring of 1911, Fisher followed as his flag commander, a post that allowed him to live at home with his new wife, cycling the four miles to work, for some nine months. Then he joined the new battlecruiser HMS Princess Royal, fitting out at Vickers, Barrow-in-Furness, but, before she was commissioned, he had left her, being promoted, at the age of 37, to captain on 1 July 1912.

"W W", as he was known, joined the battleship HMS St Vincent, wearing the flag of Rear-Admiral Somerset Gough-Calthorpe, on 10 December 1912. By 1916, she was a 'private ship' (flying no admiral's flag) and, for the early part of his service in World War I, he was still captain of the St Vincent and with her at the Battle of Jutland. He commanded that battleship for three years and five months and became Director of the Anti-Submarine Division at the Admiralty in May 1917, where he stayed until January 1919, having overseen a host of new inventions to defeat the enemy submarine menace.

He was appointed captain of the battleship HMS Iron Duke on 2 January 1919, the ship soon to join the Mediterranean Fleet. There, his initiative was put to good use in difficult diplomatic and political situations in Turkey, Egypt and the Black Sea. In August 1919, Iron Duke became the flagship of the new Commander-in-Chief, Mediterranean Fleet, Admiral Sir John de Robeck and he asked Fisher to be his Chief of Staff, in the rank of Commodore 2nd Class; he went with de Robeck in the same position to the Atlantic Fleet in 1922, first as Commodore 1st Class and then as rear-admiral.

He went on to be Rear-Admiral in the 1st Battle Squadron of the Mediterranean Fleet in 1924 for a year and then spent ten months unemployed, on half pay, before taking over as Director of Naval Intelligence for eight months, during Rear-Admiral Alan Hotham's illness. He was appointed Fourth Sea Lord and Chief of Supplies and Transport in 1927 and promoted vice-admiral in January 1928. He was made Deputy Chief of the Naval Staff in 1928, overseeing a period of naval economy. He became commander of the 1st Battle Squadron and second in command of the Mediterranean Fleet, hoisting his flag in the battleship HMS Revenge, at Marseille, in October 1930.

After a six-month respite in England, from April 1932, he was promoted to full admiral and became Commander-in-Chief, Mediterranean Fleet, hoisting his flag in the battleship HMS Resolution, on 31 October 1932. During more than a decade as a flag officer with the Mediterranean Fleet, he developed a great affection for Malta, and his love for the children of the village of Mġarr is marked by the name of Fisher Road. He handed over command at the end of March 1936 and went on to be Commander-in-Chief, Portsmouth, hoisting his flag in HMS Victory on 7 July 1936. After the Coronation Naval Review and the King's Birthday Review, on Southsea Common, he died in office, while on leave in the country, after just under a year in post, on 24 June 1937, aged 62.

== Family ==
Memorial to Fisher and his wife Cecilia, St Mary Church Lynton

Fisher married Cecilia Warre-Cornish (1 May 1886 – 30 January 1965), daughter of Francis Warre-Cornish, on 21 December 1907. Their daughter Cecilia Rosamund Fisher married Captain Richard Coleridge, 4th Baron Coleridge, of the Royal Navy on 28 August 1936; they had issue, two sons, including the present peer. Another daughter, Horatia Mary Fisher, married Group Captain Geoffrey Mungo Buxton, a grandson maternally of the 3rd Earl of Verulam, and had three surviving daughters.

Fisher was the brother of H. A. L. Fisher, Edmund Fisher, Charles Fisher, Florence Henrietta Darwin and Adeline Vaughan Williams. His sister Cordelia Fisher married the author, critic and journalist Richard Curle and was the mother of the academic Adam Curle.

He was related to the Stephen family, and in 1910 his ship HMS Dreadnought was targeted in the Dreadnought hoax by Adrian Stephen, his sister Virginia Stephen (later Virginia Woolf) and others.

== Bibliography ==
- Admiral Sir William Fisher by Admiral Sir William James (biography – published by Macmillan, 1943)

Military offices
Preceded by Alan Hotham	Director of Naval Intelligence (acting); 1926–1927	Succeeded by Barry Domvile
Preceded by Sir John Kelly	Fourth Sea Lord; 1927–1928	Succeeded by Sir Vernon Haggard
Preceded by Sir Frederick Field	Deputy Chief of the Naval Staff; 1928–1930	Succeeded by Sir Frederic Dreyer
Preceded by Lord Chatfield	Commander-in-Chief, Mediterranean Fleet; 1932–1936	Succeeded by Sir Dudley Pound
Preceded by Sir John Kelly	Commander-in-Chief, Portsmouth; 1936–1937	Succeeded by The Earl of Cork and Orrery
