= Last Essays =

1926 essay collection by Joseph Conrad

First edition

Last Essays is a volume of essays by Joseph Conrad, edited with an introduction by Richard Curle, and published posthumously in 1926 (London & Toronto: J. M. Dent & Sons).

The volume includes nineteen shorter pieces, mainly written by Conrad for various newspapers and magazines after the publication of Notes on Life and Letters in 1921. Together with the 1978 volume The Congo Diary and Other Uncollected Pieces, edited by Zdzislaw Najder, they contain all of Conrad's miscellaneous writing.

The essays in Last Essays are mainly about sea travel or literature. They contain many passages of interest to the enthusiast. The volume contains "Legends," the unfinished essay Conrad was working on when he died, and "The Congo Diary", Conrad's first known writing, since often reprinted, and of great interest to the student of Heart of Darkness. It also contains Conrad's preface to Curle's Into the East (1921), in which Conrad laments the passing of an earlier form of travel and its replacement by tourism.

"The Dover Patrol" was commissioned by Lord Northcliffe in 1921 for the unveiling of a monument commemorating the British naval efforts in protecting the English Channel during World War I.

== List of contents ==
- Geography and Some Explorers
- The "Torrens": A Personal Tribute
- Christmas Day at Sea
- Ocean Travel
- Outside Literature
- Legends
- The Unlighted Coast
- The Dover Patrol
- Memorandum on the Scheme for Fitting-Out a Sailing Ship
- The Loss of the "Dalgonar"
- Travel
- Stephen Crane
- His War Book: A Preface to Stephen Crane's The Red Badge of Courage
- John Galsworthy
- A Glance at Two Books (The Island Pharisees by John Galsworthy and Green Mansions by W. H. Hudson)
- Preface to "The Shorter Tales of Joseph Conrad"
- Cookery: Preface to Jessie Conrad's A Handbook of Cookery for a Small House
- The Future of Constantinople
- The Congo Diary
