= List of fellows of the Royal Society elected in 1839 =

This article lists fellows of the Royal Society elected in 1839.

1. Sir Thomas Dyke Acland, 10th Baronet
2. George Barker
3. Beriah Botfield
4. Robert Carrington, 2nd Baron Carrington
5. Arthur Conolly
6. Charles Darwin
7. Edward Davies Davenport
8. Henry Mangles Denham
9. Richard Drew
10. Henry Drummond
11. Arthur Farre
12. Thomas William Fletcher
13. William James Frodsham
14. Thomas Gaskin
15. George Godwin
16. John Thomas Graves
17. Edwin Guest
18. George Gulliver
19. James Halliwell-Phillipps
20. Christopher Hansteen
21. Peter Hardy
22. James Heywood
23. John Hilton
24. John Hogg
25. Gilbert Wakefield Mackmurdo
26. Samuel Roffey Maitland
27. Macedonio Melloni
28. Henry Moseley
29. H Alexander Ormsby
30. Adolphe Quetelet
31. William Reid
32. Robert Rigg
33. John Rogers
34. George Leith Roupell
35. Félix Savart
36. William Sharpey
37. Clement Tudway Swanston
38. James Joseph Sylvester
39. Charles Thorp
40. Charles Turnor
41. John Wesley Williams
42. James Yates
