= Wescott Infant School =

Coordinates: 51°24′37″N 0°49′39″W

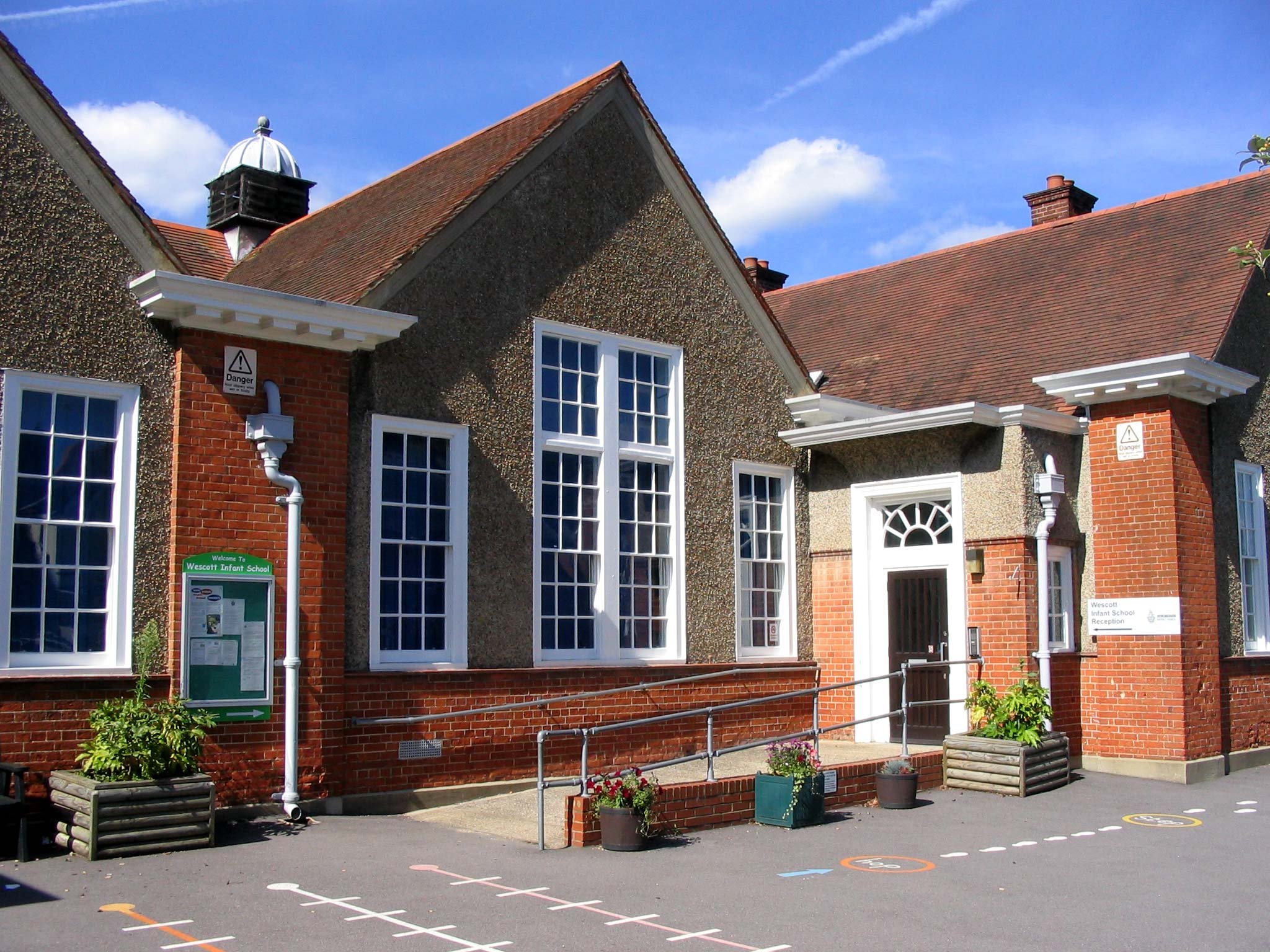
- The front entrance of Wescott Infant School

Location
- Goodchild Road; Wokingham, Berkshire, RG40 2EN; England

Information
- Type: Academy
- Established: 1906
- Local authority: Wokingham Borough Council
- Trust: The Circle Trust
- Department for Education URN: 147926 Tables
- Ofsted: Reports
- Head teacher: Stephanie Holding
- Gender: Coeducational
- Age: 4 to 7
- Website: wescottinfant.co.uk

Wescott Infant School is a coeducational infant school located in Wokingham, Berkshire, England.

The school caters for children from ages four to seven (Reception to Year 2). Children join the school as "Rising Fives" and there is a three-term intake with a maximum of around 150 children on roll each year. Wescott holds the prestigious Artsmark Gold Award from the Arts Council, and in 2003 it was awarded a DFES School Achievement Award. The school has also been awarded Healthy Schools status.

== History ==
The school was founded in 1828 as a National School for boys and girls, and was originally located in Rose Street, Wokingham, behind the existing houses at numbers 9 and 11. By 1901, the population of the town had increased threefold and as there was no room for expansion on the Rose Street site it was decided to build a new school in Goodchild Road. The new school opened on 8 January 1906. It was known as the Wescott Road Council School, and was named after Thomas Manley Wescott, the first Mayor of Wokingham. The school was built by W. Watson, builders of Ascot, at a cost of £6,000. The architect was Edmund Fisher, who was also responsible for the design of a number of other Berkshire schools. The school was intended to accommodate 400 children but the attendance was mixed and averaged 240 pupils a day during its early years. The school originally catered for boys and girls from five through to 14, which was then the school leaving age. The first headmaster was a Mr George Manoah Ebenezer Fryer. There were 11 other teachers and 222 children on the register in the first month. A further building, known as the annexe, was erected in 1911 for woodwork, cookery, and the evening continuation classes. The secondary-age pupils moved out in the 1950s to join the newly built St Crispin's School. In 1974, with the opening of Westende Junior School, Wescott became an infant school, educating children up to the age of seven.

Wescott School was designated as a Grade II listed building on 24 June 1998 by English Heritage, who describe it as a "well-designed and executed early-C20 school in the Arts and Crafts style". The adjacent school annexe, which was originally the technology block but now houses a nursery school, is also a Grade II listed building.

The school celebrated its centennial in 2006. Her Royal Highness Princess Anne visited the school on 28 March 2006 as part of the centennial celebrations to unveil a commemorative plaque. She was entertained with a short musical performance by the children, followed by the first public performance of The Wescott School song, commissioned by the school from Luke Bedford, a former pupil and winner of the BBC’s Young Composer of the Year award (2004).

Previously a community school administered by Wokingham Borough Council, in July 2020 Wescott Infant School converted to academy status. The school is now sponsored by The Circle Trust.

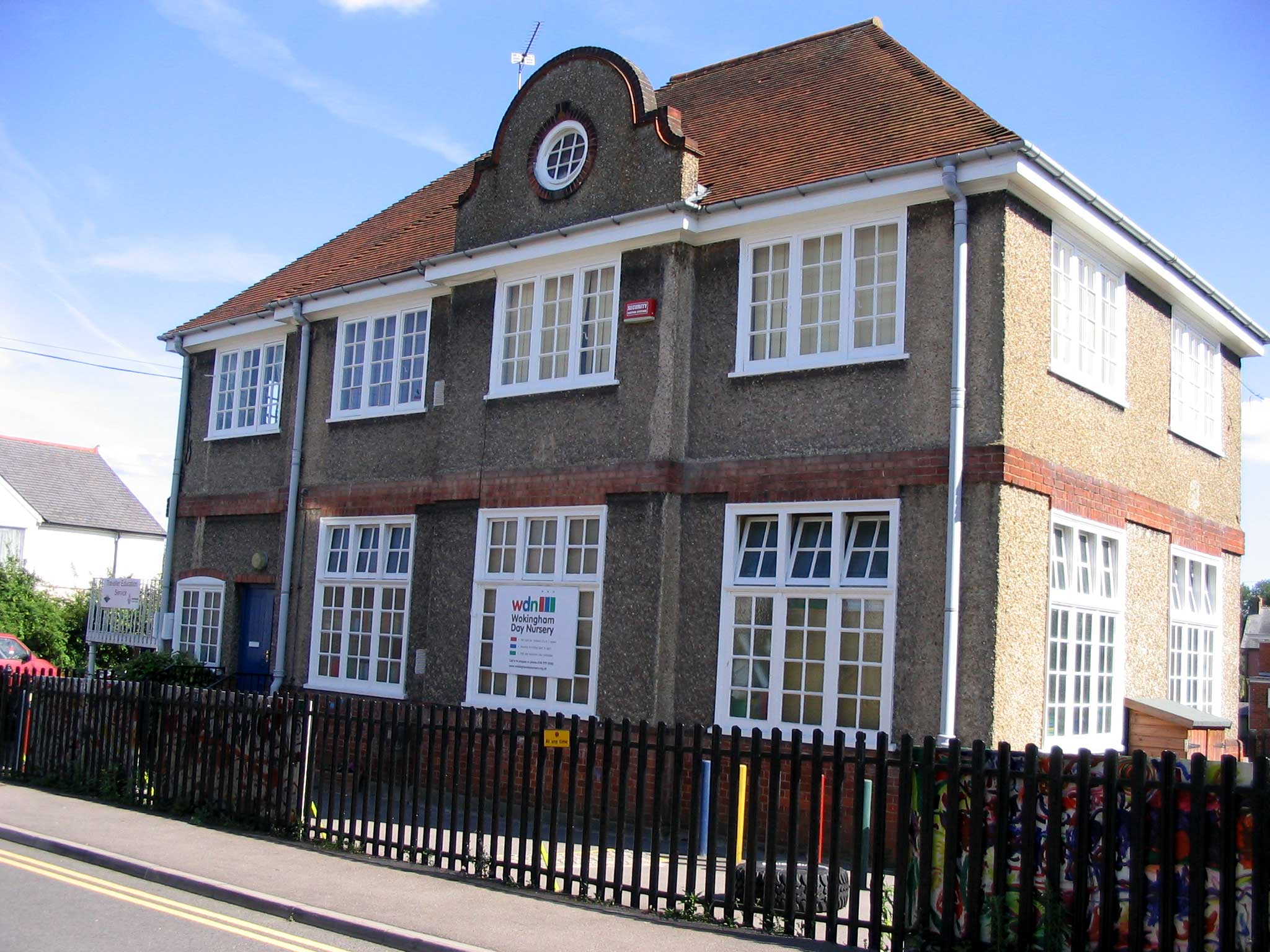
The annexe to Wescott School, now used by Wokingham Day Nursery
