= Samuel Roffey Maitland =

English historian and writer

Samuel Roffey Maitland (1792–1866) was an English historian and miscellaneous writer on religious topics. He was qualified as an Anglican priest, and worked also as a librarian, barrister and editor.

== Early life ==
Maitland was born in London at King's Road (now Theobald's Road), Bedford Row, on 7 January 1792. His father, who was of Scottish extraction, was Alexander Maitland, a London merchant; his mother was Caroline Busby, a descendant of Richard Busby. She brought her husband an estate in Gloucestershire. Alexander Maitland was a presbyterian attached to congregationalists in London, and it was only gradually that Samuel Maitland moved towards the Church of England.

Samuel Maitland left school in 1807, and was then placed under the tuition of the Rev. Launcelot Sharpe, one of the masters in Merchant Taylors' School; and on 7 October 1809 Maitland was admitted to St John's College, Cambridge, and about the same time he entered at the Inner Temple with the intention of going to the bar. Next year he migrated to Trinity College where his friend William Hodge Mill was. He left Cambridge in 1811, without a degree, unwilling to sign the Thirty-nine Articles.

In 1812 Maxwell Garthshorne died, leaving Maitland's father and uncle his executors. His estate included a large library behind him, and Maitland undertook to catalogue it, on condition of receiving the duplicates as his reward. From 1811 to 1815 he was living with his father, reading omnivorously, while preparing for the bar. When he applied to be called, he found there were difficulties, as he had not kept his terms at Cambridge. So on 10 October 1815, he returned to the university, entering again St John's. He kept three more terms, and at this time made the acquaintance of Samuel Lee, who had recently been made professor of Arabic.

During the first half of 1816, Maitland occupied chambers in the Temple, and studied. On 19 November 1816, he married. He had been called to the bar in Easter term, 1816, but his literary tastes had got an increasing hold of him.

== In holy orders ==
About 1817, Maitland left London and settled at Taunton, and during the next three or four years his religious views shifted. On 27 June 1821 he was admitted to deacon's orders at Norwich by Bishop Henry Bathurst, and licensed to the curacy of St. Edmund in the city; the rector of the parish, the Rev. Charles David Brereton, was non-resident. Maitland did not stay long at Norwich, and was admitted to priest's orders by Henry Ryder, Bishop of Gloucester. His father had recently retired to Gloucester, and on 22 May 1823 Maitland became perpetual curate of the recently built Christ Church, at Gloucester.

Maitland stayed at Gloucester until the end of 1827, and then set off on a journey to the continent. He had been interested in the conversion of the Jews for some time, and he wished to see Jewish society in Germany and Poland. He started in April 1828, travelling through France, Germany and Prussia as far as Warsaw. He sent home a series of thirty-six letters and studied German and Polish.

In 1838 Archbishop William Howley appointed Maitland librarian and keeper of the manuscripts at Lambeth Palace. The stipend attaching to the office was nominal; no preferment followed though the archbishop also conferred the degree of D.D. In 1848 Archbishop John Sumner succeeded, and Maitland returned to Gloucester an unbeneficed clergyman. Part of Maitland's library appears to have been sold in London on 21 April 1842 (and three following days), by Mr Fletcher ('A catalogue of the very select and elegant library, printed and manuscript, of a private gentleman'), the anonymous catalogue identified with Maitland by A. N. L. Munby. A copy is held at Cambridge University Library (shelfmark Munby.c.155(28)).

== Later life ==
Maitland was elected a Fellow of the Royal Society (FRS) in 1839, and when Hugh James Rose died in this same year, Maitland became editor of the British Magazine, and carried it on till 1849, when it was discontinued. The magazine after Rose's death became more and more literary and historical in its tone. Maitland had incurred the dislike of the Evangelical party by attacks on their leaders, and merciless criticism of Joseph Milner, John Foxe, and others. He had also become an object of suspicion to the Tractarians, by his Letter to a Friend on Tract No. 89, which he issued in 1841 (republished in Eight Essays, 1852).

After his return to Gloucester, and until his death, Maitland lived in retirement. He was an active supporter of William Thoms, when Notes and Queries was first started, and a frequent contributor to the earlier volumes, sometimes under the signature of "Rufus".

He was a man of many accomplishments: musician; a draughtsman; he kept a small printing press in his house, and tried his hand at bookbinding. Charles Hardwick, John Goulter Dowling, James Craigie Robertson, Henry Richards Luard, and John Eyton Bickersteth Mayor were among the historians he influenced.

Maitland died at Gloucester on 19 January 1866, in his seventy-fifth year.

== Works ==
In 1817 Maitland published his first pamphlet, A Dissertation on the Primary Objects of Idolatrous Worship, unfashionably against Jacob Bryant's writings. During his absence abroad he published A Letter to the Rev. Charles Simeon, in which he advocated the establishment of an institution which might serve as a place of refuge for Jewish converts.

In 1826 Maitland put forth a pamphlet which he called An Enquiry into the Grounds on which the Prophetic Period of Daniel and St. John has been supposed to consist of 1260 Years. This work argued against the Irvingite reading of the theory of Joachim of Fiore. The pamphlet attracted a controversy which continued for some years. One of the side issues in the controversy turned on the question of the Catholic orthodoxy, or alleged Protestantism, of the Albigenses and the Waldenses; Joseph Milner, in his Church History, had claimed them as among the "Heavenly Witnesses" during the Middle Ages. Maitland in 1832 published, in a volume of 546 pages, his most elaborate work entitled Facts and Documents illustrative of the History, Doctrine, and Rites of the ancient Albigenses and Waldenses. Maitland allowed himself to speak with something like contempt of Milner's Church History, and was attacked in print.

In 1835 Maitland began to contribute to the British Magazine, of which Hugh James Rose was then editor. Between him and Maitland, a friendship had grown, and at Rose's suggestion the articles collected in two volumes, as The Dark Ages: a Series of Essays intended to illustrate the State of Religion and Literature in the ninth, tenth, eleventh, and twelfth Centuries (1844), and Essays on Subjects connected with the Reformation in England (1849).

Maitland's other works include:

- A Dissertation on the Primary Objects of Idolatrous Worship, 1817.
- An Enquiry into the Grounds on which the Prophetic Period of Daniel and St. John has been supposed to consist of 1,260 Years, 1826; 2nd edit., pp. 72, 1837.
- Saint Bernard's Holy War Translated (by Maitland, with title-page etched by the translator), 1827.
- A Letter to the Rev. Charles Simeon (Warsaw), 21 July 1828; 2nd edit. 1828.
- A Second Enquiry, pp. 175, 1829.
- The 1,260 Days, in Reply to a Review in the "Morning Watch", No. 3, p. 509, 1830.
- An Attempt to elucidate the Prophecies concerning Antichrist, 1830; 2nd edit. 1853.
- A Letter to the Rev. W. Digby, A.M., occasioned by his Treatise on the 1,260 Days (Gloucester, 25 Oct.), 1831.
- Eruvin, or Miscellaneous Essays on Subjects connected with the Nature, History, and Destiny of Man, 1831; 2nd edit. 1850.
- The Voluntary System. Forty-two Letters reprinted from the Gloucestershire Chronicle, 1834; 2nd edit. 1837.
- The 1,260 Days, in Reply to the Strictures of William Cuninghame, Esq., 1834. Against William Cuninghame of Lainshaw.
- The Translation of Bishops, pp. 24, 1834.
- A Letter to the Rev. Hugh James Rose, B.D., Chaplain to his Grace the Archbishop of Canterbury, with Strictures on Milner's "Church History", pp. 53, 1834.
- A second Letter to the same, containing Notes on Milner's "History of the Church in the Fourth Century", pp. 87, 1835.
- A Letter to the Rev. John King, M.A., Incumbent of Christ Church, Hull, occasioned by his pamphlet, Maitland not entitled to censure Milner, pp. 91, 1835.
- Remarks on that part of Rev. J. King's pamphlet ... which relates to the Waldenses, pp. 80, 1836.
- A Review of Fox the Martyrologist's "History of the Waldenses", 1837.
- Six Letters on Fox's "Acts and Monuments", reprinted from the "British Magazine", with Notes and Additions, 1837.
- Remarks on the Constitution of the Committee of the Gloucester and Bristol Diocesan Church Building Association, 1837.
- A Letter to the Rev. W. H. Mill, D.D., containing some Strictures on Mr. Faber's recent work, entitled "The Ancient Waldenses and Albigenses", 1839.
- A Letter to a Friend on the "Tract for the Times No. 89"; reprinted in Eight Essays, 1841.
- Notes on the Contributions of the Rev. George Townsend to the new edit. of Fox's "Martyrology", 3 pts. 1841–2.
- An Index of such English Books printed before the year MDC as are now in the Archiepiscopal Library at Lambeth, pp. xii, 120, 1845.
- Remarks on the first vol. of Strype's "Life of Archbishop Cranmer", reprinted from the British Magazine, vols. i. and ii. 1848.
- Ecclesiastical History Society. A Statement, reprinted from British Magazine, 1849.
- Essays on Subjects connected with the Reformation in England, reprinted, with additions from British Magazine, 1849.
- Illustrations and Enquiries relating to Mesmerism, pt. i. pp. 82, 1849.
- A Plan for a Church History Society, pp. 16 (Gloucester, 15 October 1850), 1850.
- Eight Essays on various Subjects, pp. 254, 1852.
- Convocation. Remarks on the Charge recently delivered by the Right Rev. Lord Bishop of Oxford [Wilberforce], pp. 35, 1855.
- Superstition and Science: an Essay, 1855.
- False Worship: an Essay, 1856.
- Chatterton: an Essay, 1857.
- Notes on Strype (Gloucester), 1858.
- A Supplication for Toleration addressed to King James I by some of the late silenced Ministers, now reprinted with the King's notes by Rev. S. R. M., 1859.

Written for sale at a bazaar was The Owl: a Didactic Poem. Carefully reprinted from the original edition by Thomas Savill, dwelling in St. Martin's Lane, Westminster, 1842, 16 pp.

== Family ==
Maitland survived his wife Selina, daughter of Christopher Stephenson, vicar of Olney, and his son, John Gorham Maitland. His grandson was Frederic William Maitland (1850–1906), the historian of English Law. who was greatly influenced by his grandfather.
