= Herbert William Fisher =

British historian (1826–1903)

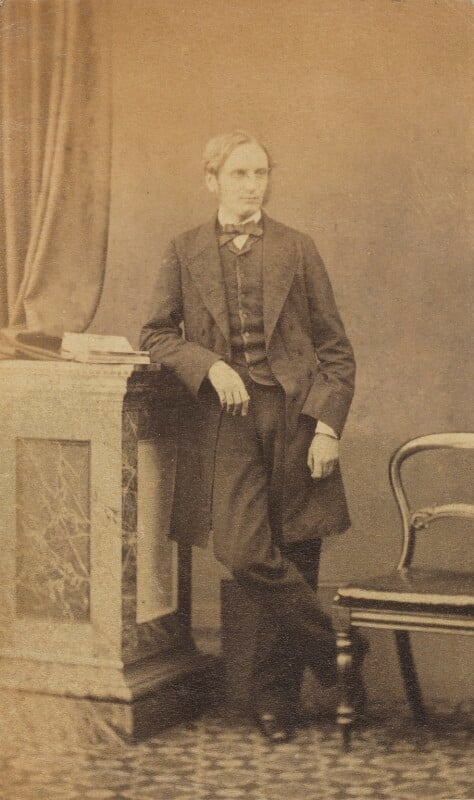
Fisher in the 1860s

Herbert William Fisher (30 July 1826 – 17 January 1903) was a British historian, best known for his book Considerations on the Origin of the American War (1865).

== Life ==
He was born at Poulshot, Wiltshire, the eldest son of Rev. William Fisher (1799–1874), rector of Poulshot from 1823 to his death, Canon of Salisbury Cathedral from 1834, and his wife Elizabeth Cookson (c.1803–1851). He was educated at Christ Church, Oxford and became a tutor in 1851. He was tutor to the future King Edward VII in 1859.

Called to the bar at Inner Temple in 1855, Fisher served as private secretary to Henry Pelham-Clinton, 5th Duke of Newcastle-under-Lyne. In 1862 he became private secretary to the Prince of Wales, his former pupil, and became Keeper of the Privy Seal in 1865, before being appointed to the position of Vice-Warden of the Stannaries, Cornwall in 1870.

Fisher married Mary Louisa Jackson (30 December 1841 – 24 August 1916) on 5 Aug 1862 in Hendon, Middlesex. She was born in Calcutta, the second daughter of John Jackson, physician in the Bengal Medical Service and her younger sister, Julia, was the mother of Virginia Woolf. Her older sister, Adeline, married Henry Halford Vaughan. Fisher and his wife had seven sons and several daughters. The sons included historian H. A. L. Fisher, and Admiral Sir William Wordsworth Fisher. Among the daughters was Florence, Lady Darwin. Another daughter, Adeline Maria, was the first wife of the composer Ralph Vaughan Williams.

Fisher's funeral took place in Brockenhurst, Hampshire on 23 January 1903. The King and Queen were represented by Major-General Sir Stanley Clarke.

== Children ==
- Florence Henrietta Fisher (31 January 1864 – 5 March 1920), married Frederic William Maitland and secondly Sir Frank Darwin
- Herbert Albert Laurens Fisher (21 March 1865 – 1940), historian and Minister of Education
- Arthur Alexander Fisher ("Jack") (10 August 1866 – 12 March 1902), artillery officer, died from injuries sustained in the Second Boer War
- Emmeline Mary Fisher (27 July 1868 – 1941), married composer and musician R. O. Morris in February 1915
- Adeline Maria Fisher (16 July 1870 – 1951), married Ralph Vaughan Williams
- Edmund Montagu Prinsep Fisher (13 January 1872 – 1918), died in the First World War
- Hervey George Stanhope Fisher (11 August 1873 – 1921), married Augustine Louise Perret in 1912
- William Wordsworth Fisher (26 March 1875 – 1937), Knight Admiral
- Charles Dennis Fisher (19 June 1877 – 31 May 1916), killed during the First World War in the Battle of Jutland
- Cordelia Fisher (27 July 1879 – 1970)
- Edwin Fisher (16 December 1883 – 1947), Chairman of Barclays Bank

Dates of birth are from FamilySearch Community Trees.
