= John Gorham Maitland =

English academic and civil servant

John Gorham Maitland (1818–1863) was an English academic and civil servant; he was a Cambridge Apostle.

== Life ==
He was the son of Samuel Roffey Maitland. He was born at Taunton, and had a private education.

Maitland was admitted to Trinity College, Cambridge in 1835. There he became one of the Cambridge Apostles. He also became a Fellow of the college, after having obtained high places in the Tripos, both classical and mathematical, in 1839.

Maitland was called to the bar at Lincoln's Inn, but found little practice. He was elected a Fellow of the Royal Society in 1847. He was secretary to the Civil Service Commission in succession to his Cambridge friend James Spedding from 1855 until his death in 1863.

== Works ==
Maitland wrote for a period in the Morning Chronicle. He was the author of two pamphlets, Church Leases, 1849, and Property and Income Tax, 1853.

== Family ==
Maitland's wife Emma, second daughter of John Frederic Daniell, died in 1851. He was survived by a son, Frederic William Maitland, and two daughters.

== Notes ==
Attribution

This article incorporates text from a publication now in the public domain: Lee, Sidney, ed. (1893). "Maitland, John Gorham". Dictionary of National Biography. Vol. 35. London: Smith, Elder & Co.
