= Neela (horse) =

Horse of Guru Gobind Singh

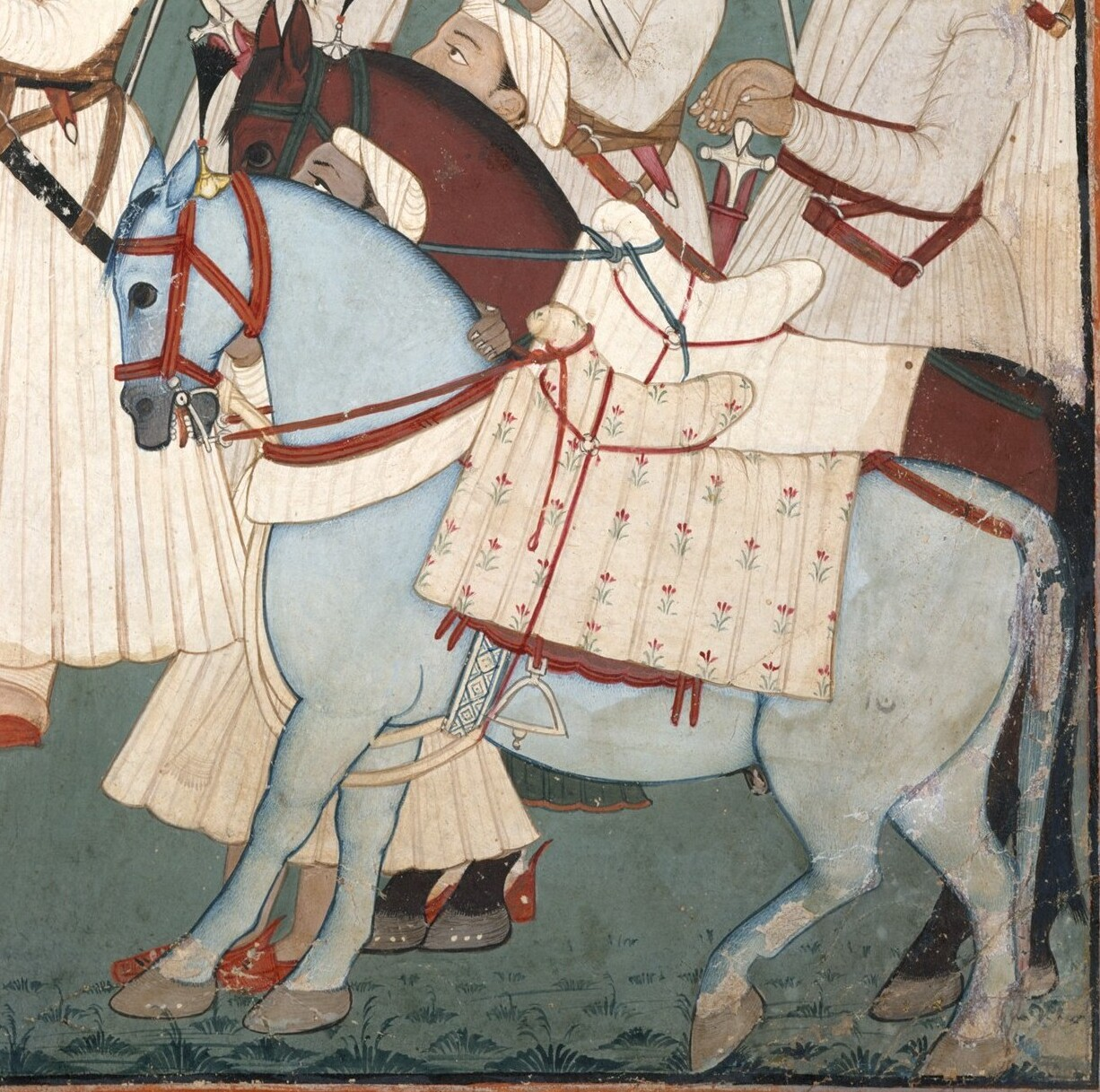
- Possible depiction of Neela, from a painting of Maharaja Sidh Sen of Mandi receiving an embassy, including Guru Gobind Singh, in 1701.
- Species: Horse
- Breed: Neela Ghora
- Sex: Male
- Born: circa second half of the 17th century
- Died: Unknown (possibly 1708)
- Notable role: Mount
- Owner: Guru Gobind Singh
- Appearance: Blue

Neela, alternatively spelt as Nila, was a Neela Ghora ("blue horse") that belonged to Guru Gobind Singh. Similar to how Indic deities are associated with a mount, known as a vahana, some have connected Neela as being a vahana of the Sikh guru.

== History ==
Guru Gobind Singh learnt horsemanship at an early-age from his maternal uncle, Kirpal Chand. It is unknown how Neela came into the possession of the Sikh guru, the horse may have been a gift from a royal dignitary or a devotee. Neela was a dark-coloured stallion that was favoured and loved by Guru Gobind Singh. Neela can be found in Sikh legends, forming part of the archetypal imagination of Guru Gobind Singh, seated on him. The horse earned Guru Gobind Singh the Neelay Ghoray Walla (nīle ghoṛe vālā) and Nile Ghore da Asvar appellations, both meaning "rider of the blue horse". Neela would have been similar to blue roan horses.

The horse appears in many Sikh stories, where its traits, such as agility, boldness, steadfastness, and intelligence, are exalted. Sikh lore claims that when Guru Gobind Singh was riding Neela whilst returning from Anandgarh, it would not enter a tobacco field and reared up in front of it. The guru tried to entice the horse to continue onward, but it refused to do so, leading to the guru to put his heels into the body of the horse, but it remained at a stand-still. It was only after that it was realized that the field that lay ahead was sown with tobacco.

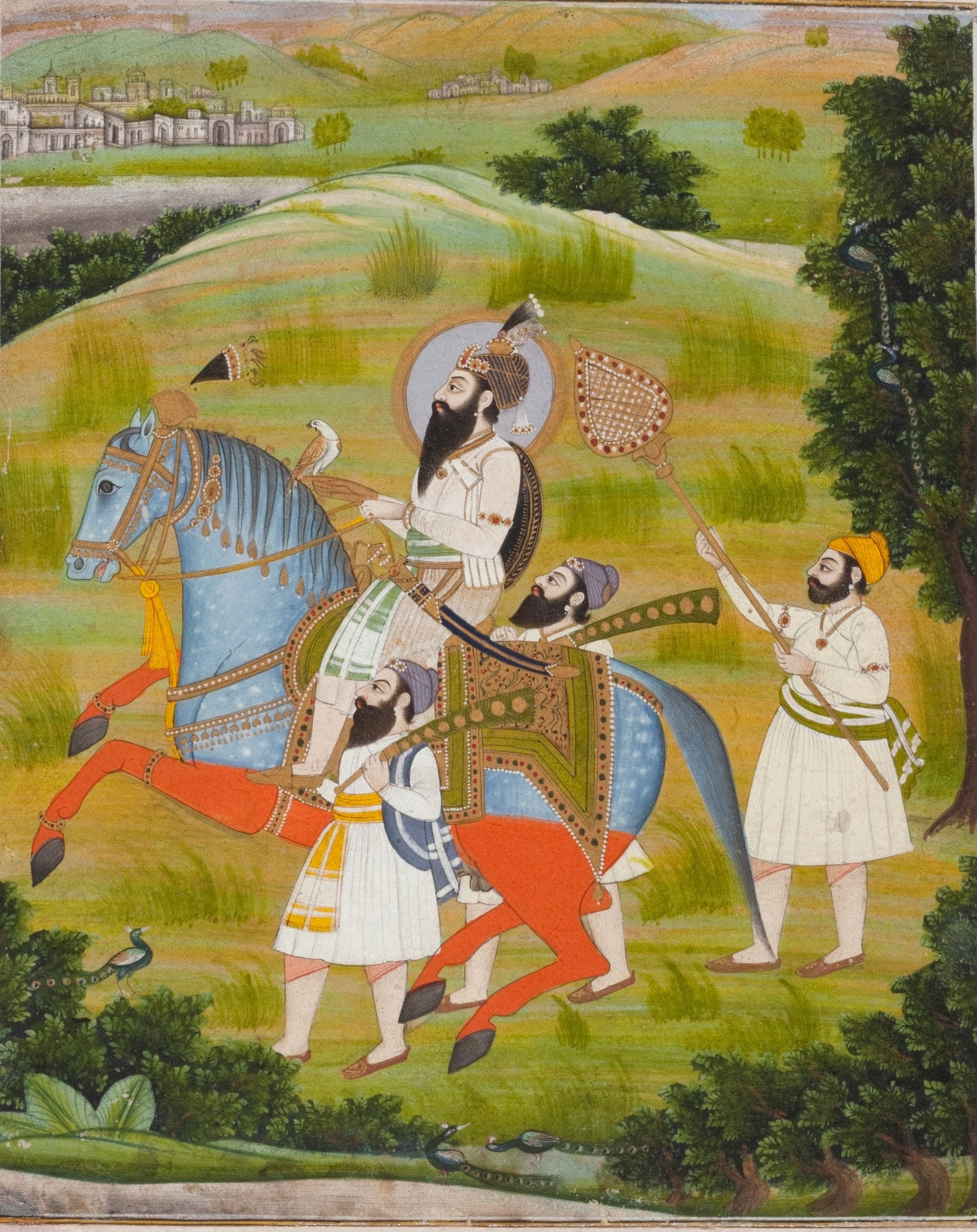
Guru Gobind Singh on Neela, ca.1830

A miraculous Sikh tale that involves Neela narrates that when Guru Gobind Singh and his horse visited the present-day location of Gurdwara Putthi Sahib whilst coming back from Anandpur Sahib, they came upon a worker baking bricks in a furnace (known as a putthi). Guru Gobind Singh asked the worker if there was a resting place in the vicinity, to which the worker responded by gesturing toward the furnace and mockingly told the Sikh guru to rest in the furnace if he is truly a guru. Whilst Sikhism is against public displays of miracles, this challenge was apparently too much for the Sikh guru to not address and the tale claims that the guru instructed Neela to trample the mud around the furnace and touched the side of the furnace with one of its hooves, causing the furnace to instantly cool down. Ordinarily, those kinds of traditional furnaces would take around a week to cool down. The story continues that the guru and his horse rested in the furnace overnight. Gurdwara Putthi Sahib was later constructed over the site and it is claimed that impressions of Neela's hoof marks are still preserved in the now solidified mud.

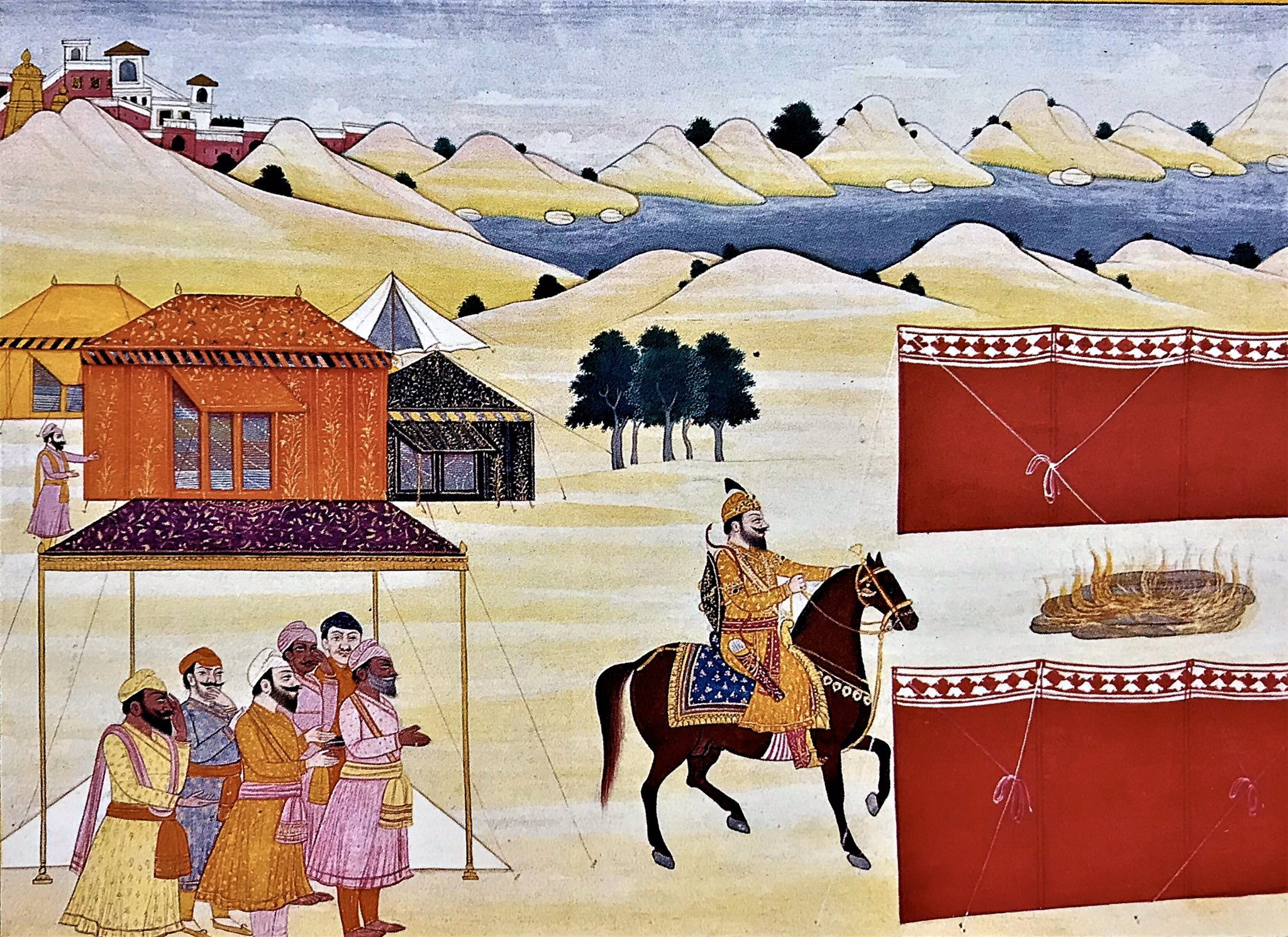
Cremation of Guru Gobind Singh at Nanded

According to a Sikh account regarding the cremation of Guru Gobind Singh at present-day Hazur Sahib in Nanded, written by Santokh Singh in the first half of the 19th century, the guru is said to have ridden his blue horse into his funeral pyre.

There are historical Sikh paintings which depict Guru Gobind Singh mounted on a blue-coloured horse.

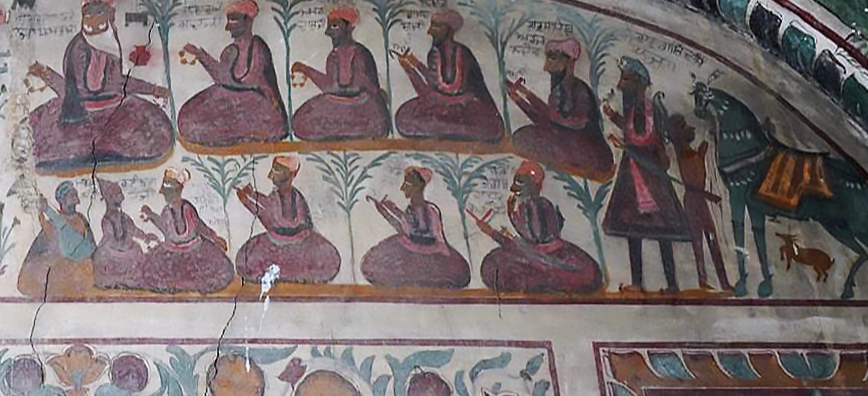
Mural depicting the Sikh gurus, Bhai Mardana, Bhai Bala, and Guru Gobind Singh's blue-horse Neela, from the Bhai Dalla samadh at Talwandi Sabo, ca.1710–1740

Some of the horses kept in the stables of Hazur Sahib in Nanded are said to be descended from Neela's lineage. However the original blue colour has been diluted over the generations to a grey-white colour. These special horses are elaborately decorated and brought-out during Hola Maholla and Gurpurab celebrations, however nobody is allowed to mount them out of reverence. The lead horse during these Hola Maholla processions at Hazur Sahib is led by a white horse that is believed to be descended from Neela. Two specific descendants of Neela at Takht Hazur Sahib are horses named Jodha Singh and Anmol Singh.

== Popular culture ==
In a work emulating one by the poet Pilu by Kishan Singh Arif, he includes Neela as one of the seven horses that are descended from Heaven, alongside the mare from the Mirza Sahiba folktale known as Bakki.

In the aftermath of Operation Blue Star, many Sikhs refused to accept that Jarnail Singh Bhindranwale had been killed in the ensuing violence, believing that a blue-horse from Heaven had come down to take him away.
