= Edwin Fisher (banker) =

British banker (1883–1947)

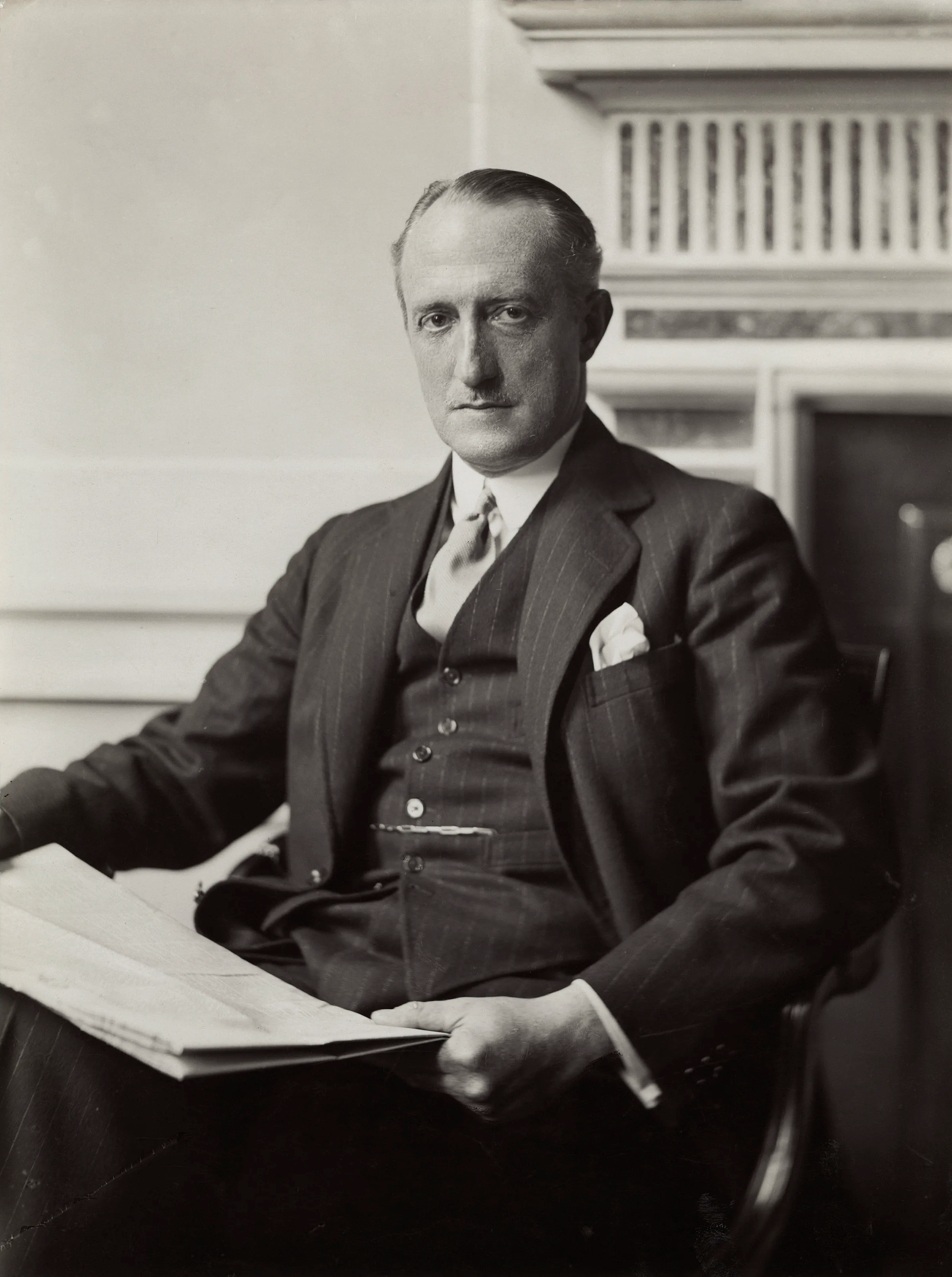
Portait by Olive Edis, c. 1925

Edwin Fisher (16 December 1883 – 27 January 1947) was an English banker, chairman of Barclay's Bank from 1936 until his death, and President of the British Bankers' Association

Fisher was the youngest son of the historian Herbert William Fisher and his wife Mary Louisa Jackson (he had 10 older siblings). His sister Cordelia Fisher married the author, critic and journalist Richard Curle and was the mother of the academic Adam Curle. He was educated at Clifton College. He served as a commissioned officer during the First World War with the 3rd The King's Own Hussars, and from 1915 the Life Guards. After the armistice, he worked his way up the ranks in Barclay's Bank, succeeding W. Favill Tuke as Chairman in 1936.
