= Jack Spurling =

English painter (1870–1933)

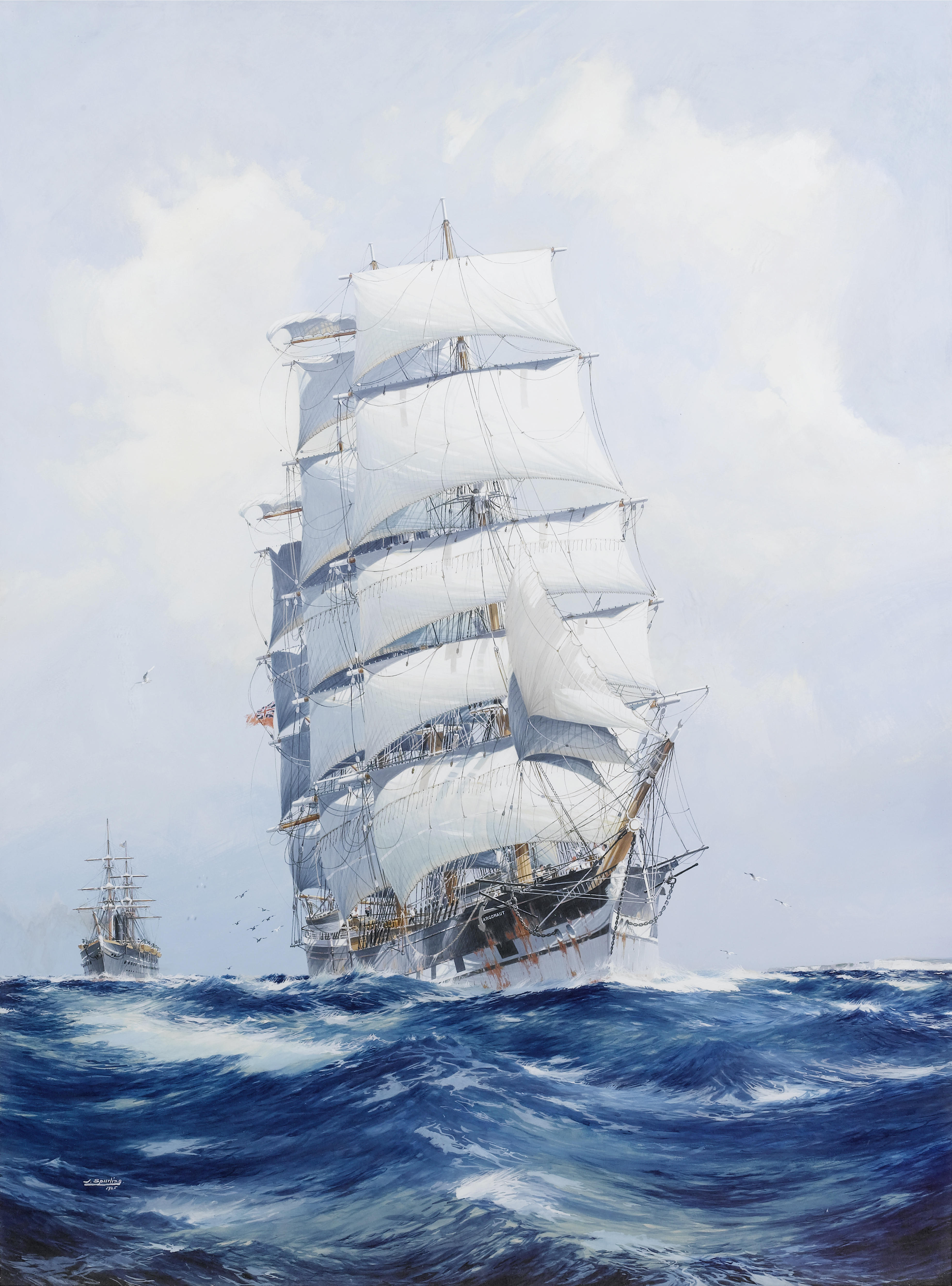
The square-rigged wool clipper Argonaut under full sail, Spurling in 1925

John Robert Charles Spurling (1870 – 1933) was an English painter noted for nautical themes, particularly sailing ships of the 19th and 20th centuries.

== History ==
Spurling was born on 12 December 1870. He was the son of an importer and grew up near the London docks, where he learned to sketch as a pastime. At the age of 16 he first went to sea as an apprentice aboard Astoria. His life nearly ended when he fell from the main upper topsail yard to the deck, he instead spent six months in a Singapore hospital. He gained his second mate's certificate after some years aboard one of Devitt & Moore's sail training vessels, and around the same time learned the art of watercolour painting, and was soon receiving commissions from other seafarers. He finished his life at sea as a sailor with the Blue Anchor Line steamers.

Spurling's second love was the stage, and promising career as an actor but success as a painter intruded: In 1921 he met Frederick Arthur Hook (died 1935), editor of The Blue Peter: The Magazine of Sea Travel, Price 1/-, a magazine for sailing enthusiasts. Hook purchased much of Spurling's portfolio of work, and contracted him to supply artwork for the covers of his magazine, the first being the issue of March 1923.

Spurling died 31 May 1933.

== Bibliography ==
Spurling's artwork for The Blue Peter was collected in three volumes, all with artwork by Spurling, text by Basil Lubbock and edited by F. A. Hook:

- Sail: The Romance of the Clipper Ships Vol. I (1923)
- Sail: The Romance of the Clipper Ships Vol. II (1929)
- Sail: The Romance of the Clipper Ships Vol. III (1933)
- Spurling Sail and Steam is Vol. IV of Jack's catalogue raisonné, edited by Warren Moore and published in 1980.
