= The Bluehorses =

Celtic rock band from Cardiff, Wales

Bluehorses
- Bluehorses live

Background information
- Origin: Cardiff, Wales
- Genres: Celtic rock, Folk rock
- Years active: 1994–2007
- Labels: Native Spirit
- Members: Lizzie Prendergast; Nic Waulker

The Bluehorses (also known as The Blue Horses) were a Celtic rock band from Cardiff, Wales, blending a mixture of rock and electric folk, and notable for being fronted by two fiddle players. They built critical acclaim for their live performances and have been described by Allmusic as "one of the roots scene’s most exciting live acts."

The band was formed in 1994 by singer and multi-instrumentalist Liz Prendergast, violinist Emily Grainger and drummer Nic Waulker. when they were students at the Welsh College of Music and Drama. Throughout its life from 1994 to 2007, Bluehorses core comprised Prendergast and Waulker, who wrote the bulk of the material. After building a live following and releasing several EPs, the band released their first full-length album, Cracking Leather, Skin and Bone in 1997. The group subsequently received an endorsement from Bridge Instruments, manufacturer of electric violins.

== Members ==
- Lizzie Prendergast (vocals, electric violin, Electric Celtic Harp, Mandocaster, synthesizer)
- Nic Waulker (Drums, programming, arrangements, producer)

== Discography ==
- Cracking Leather, Skin and Bone
- The Live Album
- Dragons Milk and Coal
- Ten Leagues Beyond the Wild Worlds End
- Skyclad
- Live at Saul Festival (DVD)
- Thirteen Fires 2007
