= The Blue Peter (magazine) =

Periodical

The Blue Peter: The Magazine of Sea Travel
- Editor: Frederick Arthur Hook
- Categories: sea travel magazine
- Frequency: Monthly
- Format: A4
- Publisher: The Peninsular and Oriental Steam Navigation Company (P&O)
- Total circulation (1931): 11,000/month
- Founder: Frederick Arthur Hook (1864–1935)
- Founded: 1 July 1921; 104 years ago
- First issue: 1 July 1921; 104 years ago
- Final issue: 1 May 1939; 86 years ago
- Country: United Kingdom

The Blue Peter: The Magazine of Sea Travel was a British sea travel magazine that ran from 1921 to 1939, when it was succeeded (or, perhaps, subsumed) by The Trident [Magazine] Incorporating Blue Peter - Magazine of the Sea, which ran to September 1957.

== History ==
Blue Peter: A Magazine of Sea Travel (later subtitled, 'The Magazine of Sea Travel') was named for given to the nautical signal flag that represents the letter “P”, which, "hoisted at the foremast-head of a ship in port, is the signal for all persons concerned to repair on board, as [the ship] is about to proceed to sea" It was published by the Peninsular and Oriental Steam Navigation Company (P&O) to promote P&O and its shipping companies and served as a kind of "nautical ... in-flight magazine" provided gratis to passengers on ships. (Note: A note in early editions of the magazine obliquely explained its purpose as an advertisement: "This publication is intended to serve as the official magazine of a group of shipping companies, whose identity the reader will readily discover. Its further aim will be, in outline or in detail, as the occasion may demand, to place before the travelling public some account of the manifold aspects of the important world-travel system over which, now that war conditions are passing away, the ships of the grouped companies are plying once more, in the service of itinerant mankind, his mails and merchandise." See:"The Blue Peter". Blue Peter: A Magazine of Sea-Travel. Vol. 1, no. 1. Blue Peter Publishing Company. July 1921. p. 1.) When not on a P&O boat, the magazine was sold for 1s, and annual subscriptions of 12 issues (post paid) could be had for 13s. 6d.

The magazine published artwork, non-fiction and historical articles, poems, fiction, travel stories, book reviews, maps, correspondence, and advertisements. Charles Dixon, Jack Spurling, Frank Henry Mason and other maritime painters and illustrators featured on the magazine's cover. By 1923, it was possible to purchase prints of the covers for 1 shilling and 6 pence. The Scottish author Richard Curle wrote a number of essays about Joseph Conrad for The Blue Peter, which, in October 1923, published "A Clipper Ship I Knew" by Joseph Conrad and, in October 1925, "Joseph Conrad's diary (hitherto unpublished) of his journey up the valley of the Congo in 1890." It also published Jessie (Joseph's wife) Conrad's "Our Visit to Poland in 1914" in August and September 1925. Other regular contributors included the historian Basil Lubbock, the novelist Louis Golding, Walter George Bell, and John Scott Hughes.
