= Frederic William Maitland =

English legal historian (1850–1906)

Frederick W. Maitland FBA
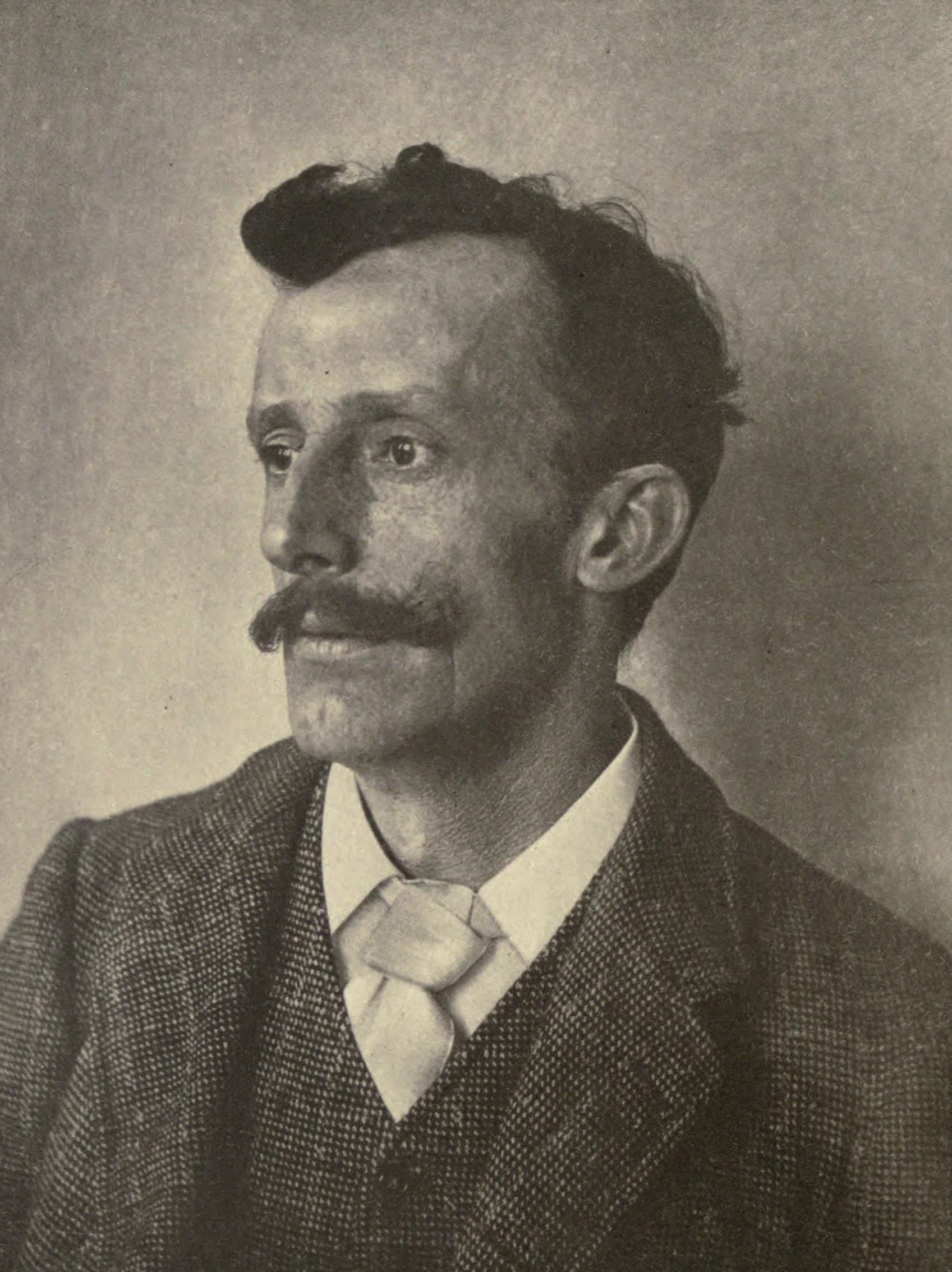
- Photogravure by Annan & Sons
- Born: 28 May 1850; London, England
- Died: c. 19 December 1906 (aged 56); Las Palmas, Gran Canaria, Spain
- Education: Trinity College, Cambridge
- Occupation: Historian
- Title: Downing Professor of the Laws of England
- Spouse: Florence Henrietta Fisher (m. 1886)
- Children: Ermengard; Fredegond

Frederic William Maitland FBA (28 May 1850 – c. 19 December 1906) was an English historian of medieval England and jurist who is regarded as the modern father of English legal history. From 1884 until 1888, he was Reader in English Law at Cambridge. He was Downing Professor of the Laws of England from 1888 until he died in 1906. He came from a distinguished intellectual family. Maitland was educated at Eton College and Trinity College, Cambridge. Leaving for the bar after an initial failure to obtain a fellowship at Cambridge, he returned to academia in 1884 and quickly became one of the most distinguished historians of his generation.

== Early life and education, 1850–72 ==
Frederic William Maitland was born on 28 May 1850 at 53 Guilford Street in London. He was the only son and second of three children of John Gorham Maitland and Emma, daughter of John Frederic Daniell. His grandfather was Samuel Roffey Maitland. Maitland's father was a barrister but, having little practice, became a civil servant, serving as secretary to the Civil Service Commission.

Maitland was educated at a preparatory school in Brighton before entering Eton College in 1863, where Edward Daniel Stone was his private tutor. At Eton, Maitland was not prominent either academically or athletically, although a close school friend thought he would become "a kind of philosophic Charles Lamb". He then matriculated at Trinity College, Cambridge, in 1869 as a commoner. A dislike of classics acquired at Eton initially led him to read mathematics, with little success. Then, inspired by Henry Sidgwick, he switched to the relatively new moral sciences tripos in 1870, and took first-class honours in 1872, being bracketed senior with his friend William Cunningham; he was elected a scholar of his college the same year. The following year, he took his degree and won the Whewell Scholarship in international law.

Popular among his contemporaries, Maitland was elected secretary, then president, of the Cambridge Union. He was also, like his father before him, a Cambridge Apostle. A lover of exercise since his Eton days, he rowed for Trinity and ran for the university, winning a blue for representing the university in three-mile races.

Maitland's mother had died in 1851, shortly after the birth of his younger sister. Then, both his father and grandfather died when he was still at school. From his grandfather, he inherited a manor house and some land in Brookthorpe, Gloucestershire. The estate provided him with an income until the agricultural depression in the 1880s.

== Career at the bar and early efforts, 1872–84 ==
=== Career at the bar ===
After Cambridge, Maitland tried to gain a fellowship in philosophy at Trinity College in 1875 with a dissertation entitled A Historical Sketch of Liberty and Equality: As Ideals of English Political Philosophy from the Time of Hobbes to the Time of Coleridge, but was beaten out by fellow Apostle James Ward. Having joined Lincoln's Inn as a student in 1872, he was called to the bar there in 1876, and became a competent equity lawyer and conveyancer.

Meanwhile, encouraged by Sidgwick, he began a book on property law, but abandoned it out of frustration at certain features of English property law; he expressed these sentiments in an anonymous article in the Westminster Review in 1879, described as "a bold, eloquent, and humorous plea for a sweeping change in the English law of Real Property". It was followed by three further articles in the Law Magazine and Review between 1881 and 1883.

=== Meeting with Vinogradoff ===
In 1880, Maitland was introduced by Frederick Pollock, who had been to Eton and Cambridge with him, to the Sunday Tramps, a walking club founded by Leslie Stephen. Through Pollock, Maitland was introduced in 1884 to Paul Vinogradoff, a Russian medievalist who was in England to study records lodged in the Public Record Office.

Maitland would later write that the day of his first meeting with Vinogradoff "determined the rest of my life". According to H. A. L. Fisher, Maitland was so chagrined by the fact that a Russian knew more about English legal records than he did that he made his first visit to the PRO shortly thereafter, though Geoffrey Elton points out that Maitland had already been working in the archives before he met Vinogradoff. The result of Maitland's initial work was Pleas of the Crown for the County of Gloucester, a transcription of the 1221 Gloucestershire eyre roll, which he published at his own expense in 1884 and dedicated to Vinogradoff.

== Return to Cambridge and marriage, 1884–88 ==
In 1884, Maitland was elected Reader in English law at Cambridge, having failed to be elected to a readership at Oxford the previous year. The post had been personally endowed by Sidgwick, to the tune of £300 a year for four years. In 1887, Maitland published, again at his own expense, an edition of Bracton's notebook in three volumes, acting on a suggestion by Vinogradoff. He also published extensively on legal history in the Law Quarterly Review, which was edited by Sidgwick.

On 20 July 1886, Maitland married Florence Henrietta Fisher in a village church in Hampshire. He had met her through Stephen: her aunt was Stephen's second wife. Fisher was the daughter of Herbert William Fisher and the sister of H. A. L. Fisher, a future Liberal minister and Maitland's biographer. They had two daughters: Ermengard (named after a woman whose name appeared in Bracton's notebook) in 1887 and Fredegond in 1889. By all accounts the marriage was a success, and the household a happy one.

=== Selden Society ===
In 1887, Maitland was among the founders of the Selden Society, established to promote the study of the history of English law, mainly through the publication of English legal manuscripts. The Society's first years were rocky: its treasurer, P. E. Dove, committed suicide in 1894, leaving behind a deficit of £1,000. Nevertheless, the Society published a steady stream of volumes under Maitland's direction as its first literary director. He personally edited eight volumes for the Society, contributed to more, and personally reviewed the proofs of every volume.

== Downing Professor, 1888–1906 ==
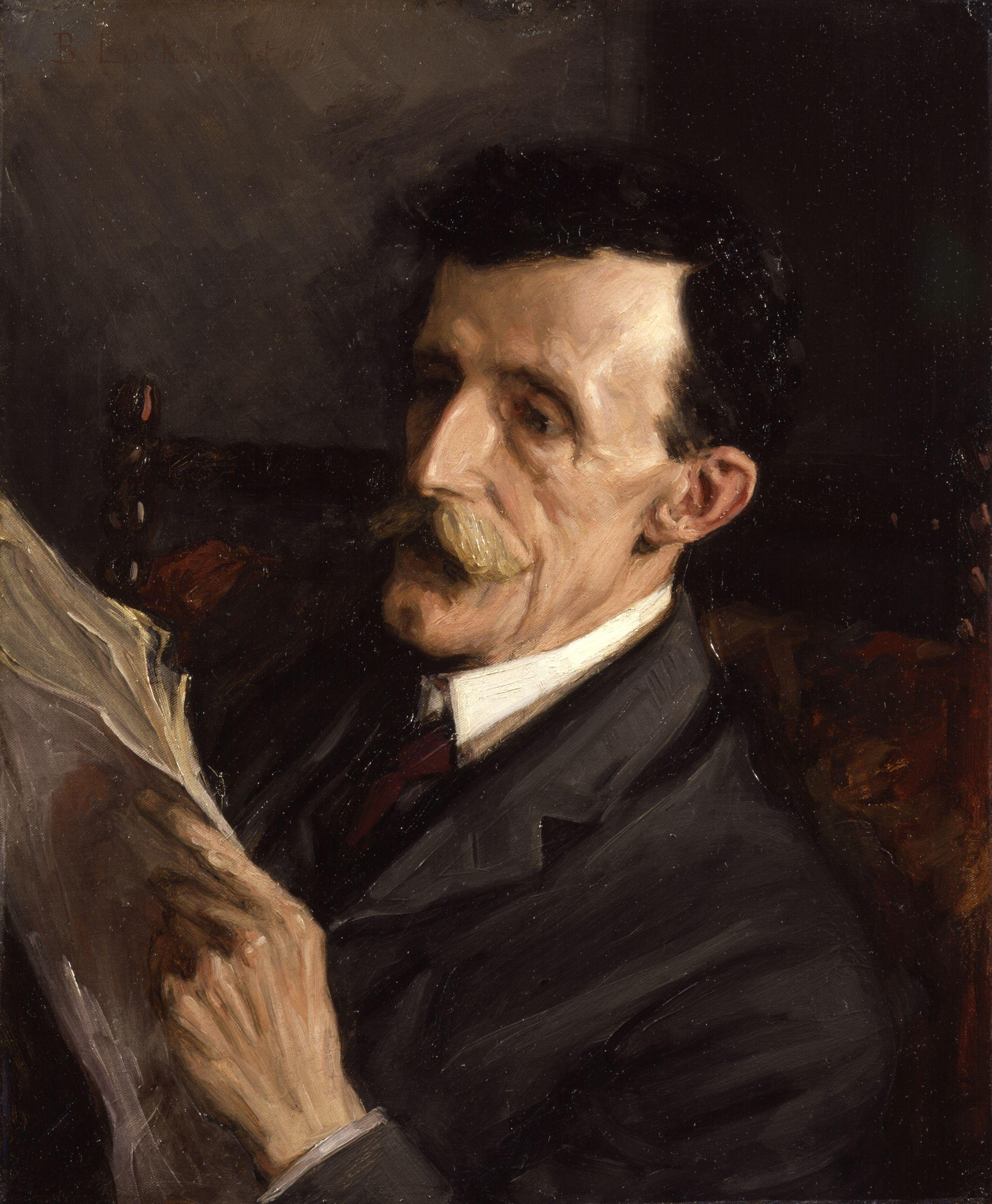
Portrait of Maitland by Beatrice Lock

In 1888, Maitland was elected Downing Professor of the Laws of England, becoming a fellow of Downing College. On 13 October 1888, he gave his inaugural lecture, "Why the History of English Law is Not Written". The post carried with it an official residence, and Maitland's family settled in happily. He held frequent musical gatherings, and kept a series of exotic pets, including a monkey, a meerkat, and a badger. The same year, he published Select pleas of the Crown, A.D. 1200–1225, the first publication of the Selden Society.

In addition to teaching duties, Maitland served on numerous University and college bodies. He advocated for a number of reforms, including the abandonment of Greek as a compulsory entrance subject and the admission of women to degrees. In March 1897 he helped defeat a proposal for the creation of a Queen's University for women only as an alternative to granting them Cambridge degrees, making a speech which was long afterwards remembered.

Meanwhile, Maitland published extensively, making important contributions to the Cambridge Modern History, the English Historical Review, the Law Quarterly Review, Harvard Law Review and other publications. He delivered the Ford Lectures in English history at Oxford in 1897 (later published as Township and Borough) and the Rede Lecture in 1901. His most important work, The History of English Law Before the Time of Edward I, appeared in 1895. It was co-authored with his friend Sir Frederick Pollock, though the latter wrote only the chapter on Anglo-Saxon law: "Chapter 1...was Pollock's work, and Maitland's reaction was never to let him write another." Popularly known as "Pollock and Maitland", The History of English Law has been described as "the best book on English legal history ever published in the English language."

In 1902 Maitland was offered the Regius Professorship of Modern History at Cambridge by Arthur Balfour in succession to Lord Acton, but declined. In the same year he became one of the founding fellows of the British Academy.

== Final years and death ==
Maitland's health began to deteriorate in the 1890s: the exact nature of his illness remains unclear but has been variously ascribed to tuberculosis or diabetes. In 1898 he suffered from an attack of pleurisy, and thereafter he wintered either in the Canary Islands or in Madeira. In December 1906, he left Cambridge for the Canaries for the last time: during the trip, he contracted influenza, which turned into double pneumonia. He died at Las Palmas and was buried in the English Cemetery there.

Upon his death, the University of Oxford presented an address of condolence to Cambridge, described by Geoffrey Elton as an "unprecedented tribute." Such addresses were often presented to the royal family, but the only precedent in the case of Maitland was an address to the University of Berlin upon the death of Theodor Mommsen.

Posthumous publications by his students, editing their lecture notes based on his lectures, include The Constitutional History of England, Equity, and The Forms of Action at Common Law. The latter publication has been repeatedly reprinted, and contains perhaps his most-quoted observation, which still appears in learned articles and superior court judgments: "The forms of action we have buried but still they rule us from their graves."

== Personal life ==
Maitland married Florence Henrietta Fisher, daughter of the historian Herbert William Fisher, in 1886 and they had two daughters, Ermengard (1887–1968) and Fredegond (1889–1949); after Maitland's death his widow married Sir Francis Darwin, a son of Charles Darwin.

Maitland was a moderate Liberal in politics, sympathizing with the Liberal Party but striving to maintain objectivity in his scholarship. Florence Fisher's brother, the Liberal scholar and politician H. A. L. Fisher, edited Maitland's papers and lectures on English constitutional history after his death.

== Scholarship ==
=== Approach and style ===
His written style was elegant and lively. His historical method was distinguished by his thorough and sensitive use of historical sources, and by his determinedly historical perspective. Maitland taught his students, and all later historians, not to investigate the history of law purely or mostly by reference to the needs of the present, but rather to consider and seek to understand the past on its own terms.

=== Memoranda de Parliamento ===
In 1889, Maitland was invited by Henry Maxwell Lyte, the Deputy Keeper of the Public Records, to examine and edit the petitions presented to Edward I's parliament. Maitland quickly determined that the task was too large to be completed by one man. However, by chance, he discovered a hitherto unpublished parliament roll from 1305, which he edited and published in 1893 as part of the Rolls Series. This formed the basis of what Elton described as his "most explosive contribution to English history".

At the time, it was generally believed that early English parliaments were, from the beginning, an assembly of the estates of the realm who met to discuss affairs of state. This view had been laid down by Stubbs, who had based his view on the 1295 "Model Parliament". In his introduction to the 1305 roll, Maitland instead proposed that early English parliaments were judicial bodies that met mainly to receive petitions to address grievances. Though the revolutionary nature of Maitland's suggestion was realised only later, most historians have come to accept Maitland's view.

=== "Why the history of English Law is not written?" ===
On 13 October 1888, Maitland gave his inaugural lecture as Downing Professor of the Laws of England. Pointing out that "no attempt has ever been made to write the history of English law as a whole", he proposed two causes: the insularity of English law and the conflicting logics of the lawyer and of the historian.

== Assessment ==
Maitland was held in high regard by his contemporaries. Lord Acton called him the ablest historian in England.

Maitland's reputation has stood high since his death. Speaking in 1980, S. F. C. Milsom said that Maitland is "not just revered but loved" by historians, while in 1985, Sir Geoffrey Elton wrote of Maitland as the "patron saint" of historians.

Beginning in the 1960s, scholars such as S. F. C. Milsom and Patrick Wormald began to point out shortcomings in Maitland's views, which had by then become the orthodoxy, although the criticisms were inevitably coupled with sincere admiration for Maitland. The highly technical nature of Maitland's work, as well as the relative decline of legal history, made Maitland's views "lasting orthodoxies", as few historians had either the technical knowledge or the inclination to challenge them. Speaking on the centenary of the publication of Pollock and Maitland, Milsom said that:

"if we go on as we are, we can look forward to our successors celebrating the bicentenary of 'Pollock and Maitland' as still the last word on the history of English law in its most crucial period. I wonder whether he would be pleased."

== Honours and memorials ==
During his lifetime, Maitland received honorary doctorates from the universities of Cambridge (1891), Oxford (1899), Glasgow (1896), Moscow and Kracow. He was one of the founding fellows of the British Academy in 1902, and was a corresponding member of the Royal Prussian Academy of the Arts and of the Bavarian Academy of Sciences and Humanities. He was also an honorary fellow of Trinity College, Cambridge, and an honorary bencher of Lincoln's Inn. On the latter honour, Maitland wrote to Pollock that "one of the vacant bishoprics would have been less of a surprise". Just before his death, Maitland received the Ames Medal from Harvard Law School, and at the time of his death, he had been invited by Oxford to deliver the Romanes Lecture.

After his death, the F. W. Maitland Memorial Fund was established at Cambridge in 1907 to promote research in legal history. It continues to award grants and studentships for that purpose. In 2000, a Maitland Legal History Room was established within the Squire Law Library of the Faculty of Law at the University of Cambridge. The Maitland Historical Society of Downing College, Cambridge, is also named in his honour.

At Oxford, the Maitland Library, begun with 300 books from Maitland's library, was established in 1908. Originally housed at All Souls College, Oxford, it was eventually taken over by the Bodleian Library, and was maintained as a separate collection until 1933.

In 2001, a memorial stone for Maitland was unveiled in Poet's Corner, Westminster Abbey; he was the first professional historian to be so honoured. The stone, cut by Richard Kindersley, is inscribed with a quote from his Domesday Book and Beyond: "By slow degrees the thoughts of our forefathers their common thoughts about common things will have become thinkable once more".

== See also ==
- Otto von Gierke
- Herbert Fisher
- Henry de Bracton
- Paul Vinogradoff
- Social law
- Quia Emptores, Seisin and Cestui que

== Works ==
His principal works include:

- Frederic Maitland, ed. (1884). Pleas of the Crown for the County of Gloucester before the Abbot of Reading and his Fellows Justices Itinerant in the fifth year of the reign of king Henry the Third and the year of Grace 1221. Macmillan & Co.
- Justice and Police, Macmillan & Co., 1885.
- Bracton's Note-Book, Vol. 2, C. J. Clay & Sons, 1887 [reissued by Cambridge University Press, 2010]. ISBN 978-1-108-01031-3)
- Memoranda de Parliamento, H.M. Stationery Office, 1893.
- History of English Law before the Time of Edward I, with Sir Frederick Pollock, Cambridge University Press, 1899 [1st Pub. 1895; new ed. 1898].
- Domesday Book and Beyond, Cambridge University Press, 1897.
- Township and Borough: Being the Ford Lectures Delivered in the University of Oxford in the October Term of 1897, Cambridge University Press, 1898.
- Roman Canon Law in the Church of England, Methuen & Co., 1898.
- English Law and the Renaissance: the Rede Lecture for 1901, Cambridge University Press, 1901.
- Charters of the Borough of Cambridge, Cambridge University Press, 1901 (reissued by Cambridge University Press, 2010. ISBN 978-1-108-01043-6)
- Life and Letters of Leslie Stephen, Duckworth & Co., 1906.
- The Constitutional History of England, Cambridge University Press, 1909 [1st Pub. 1908].
- Equity. Also the Forms of Action at Common Law, Edited by A.H. Chaytor and W.J. Whittaker, Cambridge University Press, 1910.
- The Collected Papers of Frederic William Maitland, H.A.L. Fisher, ed., Vol. I, Cambridge University Press, 1911.
- The Collected Papers of Frederic William Maitland, H.A.L. Fisher, ed., Vol. II, Cambridge University Press, 1911.
- The Collected Papers of Frederic William Maitland, H.A.L. Fisher, ed., Vol. III, Cambridge University Press, 1911.
- A Sketch of English Legal History, with Francis G. Montague, G. P. Putnam's Sons, 1915.
- Fifoot, C. H. S., ed. (1965). The Letters of Frederic William Maitland. Cambridge University Press: Cambridge University Press and the Selden Society – via Internet Archive.

=== Essays ===
- "The Relation of Punishment to Temptation," Mind, Vol. V, 1880.
- "The Criminal Liability of the Hundred," The Law Magazine and Review, Vol. VII, 1882.
- "Mr. Herbert Spencer's Theory of Society," Part II, Mind, Vol. VIII, 1883.
- "From the Old Law Courts to the New," The English Illustrated Magazine, Vol. I, 1883.
- "The Seisin of Chattels," The Law Quarterly Review, Vol. I, 1885.
- "The Deacon and the Jewess: or, Apostasy at Common Law," The Law Quarterly Review, Vol. II, 1886.
- "The Mystery of Seisin," The Law Quarterly Review, Vol. II, 1886.
- "The Suitors of the County Court," The English Historical Review, Vol. III, 1888.
- "The Beatitude of Seisin," Part II, The Law Quarterly Review, Vol. IV, 1888.
- "The Surnames of English Villages", The Archaeological Review, Vol. IV, No. 4, 1889.
- "The Introduction of English Law into Ireland," The English Historical Review, Vol. IV, 1889.
- "The Materials for English Legal History," Part II, Political Science Quarterly, Vol. IV, 1889.
- "The 'Praerogativa Regis'," The English Historical Review, Vol. VI, 1891.
- "Henry II and the Criminous Clerks," The English Historical Review, Vol. VII, 1892.
- "The 'Quatripartitus'," The Law Quarterly Review, Vol. VIII, 1892.
- "The History of Cambridgeshire Manor," The English Historical Review, Vol. IX, No. 35, July 1894.
- "The Origin of the Borough," The English Historical Review, Vol. IX, 1896.
- "Wyclif on English and Roman Law," The Law Quarterly Review, Vol. XII, 1896.
- "'Execrabilis' in the Common Pleas," The Law Quarterly Review, Vol. XII, 1896.
- "Canon Law in England," The English Historical Review, Vol. XII, 1897.
- "The Corporation Sole," The Law Quarterly Review, Vol. XVI, 1900, pp. 335–354
- "The Crown as Corporation," The Law Quarterly Review, Vol. XVII, 1901, pp. 131–146
- "Prologue to a History of English Law." In: Select Essays in Anglo-American Legal History, Vol. I. Boston: Little, Brown, and Company, 1907.
- "Materials For the History of English Law." In: Select Essays in Anglo-American Legal History, Vol. II. Boston: Little, Brown, and Company, 1908.
- "The History of the Register of Original Writs." In: Select Essays in Anglo-American Legal History, Vol. II. Boston: Little, Brown, and Company, 1908.

=== Other ===
- "Glanville, Ranulf de." In: Dictionary of National Biography, Vol. XXI, 1890.
- "Court Rolls, Manorial Accounts and Extents." In: Dictionary of Political Economy, Vol. I, 1894.
- Essays on the Teaching of History, William Arthur Jobson Archbold, ed., with an introduction by F.W. Maitland, Cambridge University Press, 1901.
- Maitland, Frederic William (1911). "Bracton, Henry de" . Encyclopædia Britannica. Vol. 4 (11th ed.). p. 369.
- Maitland, Frederic William (1911). "English Law" . Encyclopædia Britannica. Vol. 9 (11th ed.). pp. 600–607.
