= Francis Darwin =

British naturalist (1848–1925)

Sir Francis Darwin FLS FRS FRSE
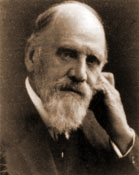
- Born: 16 August 1848; Down House, Downe, Kent, England
- Died: 19 September 1925 (aged 77); Cambridge, England
- Resting place: Ascension Parish Burial Ground
- Known for: Phototropism
- Spouses: Amy Richenda Ruck (m. 1874; died 1876) Ellen Wordsworth Crofts (m. 1883; died 1903) Florence Henrietta Fisher (m. 1913)
- Children: Bernard Darwin; Frances Cornford
- Parent(s): Charles Darwin; Emma Wedgwood
- Scientific career
- Fields: Botany

Sir Francis Darwin FLS FRS FRSE (16 August 1848 – 19 September 1925) was a British botanist. He was the third son of the naturalist and scientist Charles Darwin.

== Biography ==
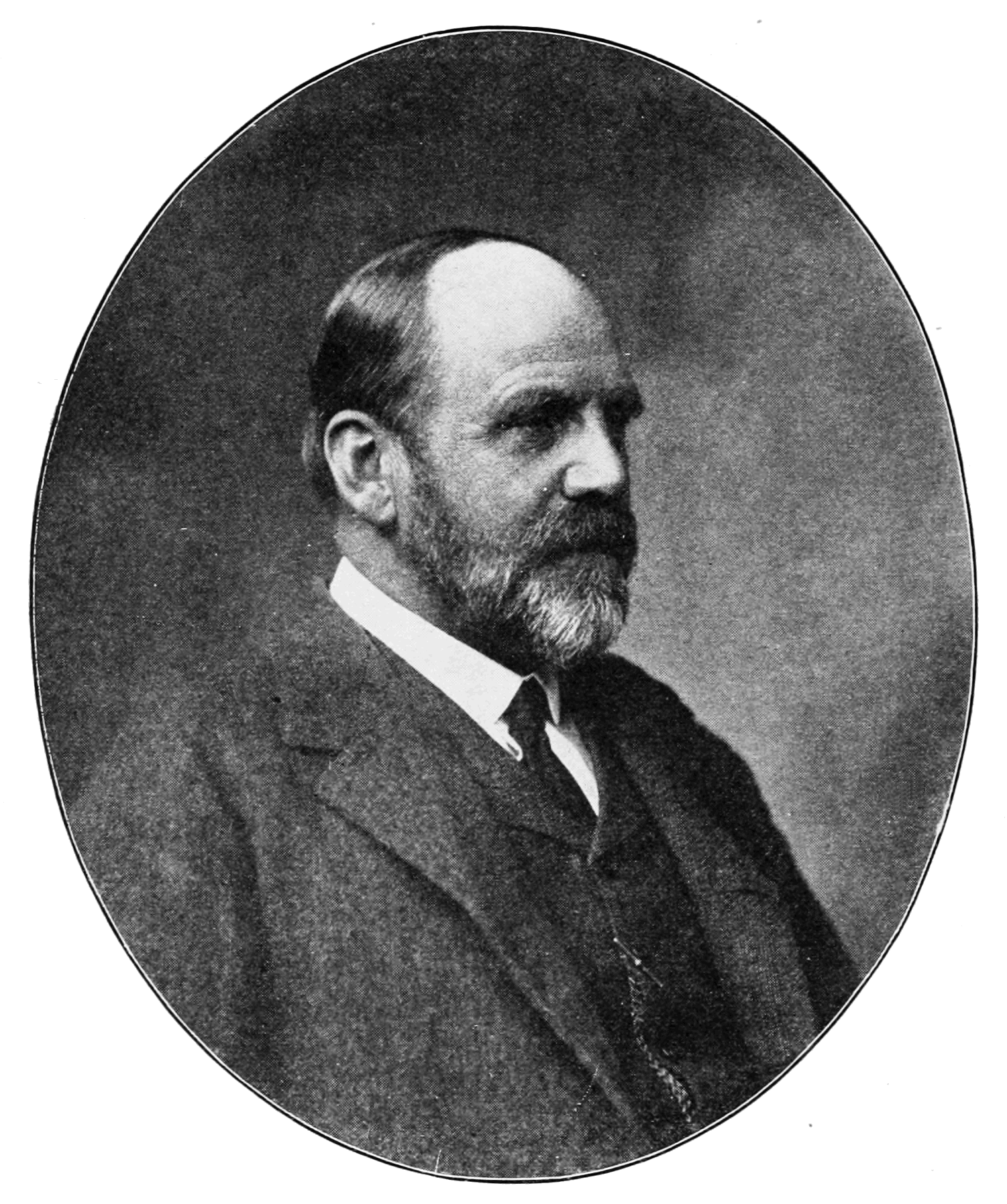
Francis Darwin in 1910

Francis Darwin was born at Down House, Downe, Kent in 1848. He was the third son and seventh child of Charles Darwin and his wife Emma Wedgwood. He was educated at Clapham Grammar School.

He then went to Trinity College, Cambridge, initially studying mathematics, then changing to natural sciences, graduating in 1870. He then went to study medicine at St George's Medical School, London, earning an MB in 1875, but did not practice medicine.

Francis Darwin worked with his father on experiments dealing with plant movements, specifically phototropism. They co-authored The Power of Movement in Plants (1880) and Francis Darwin published a second expanded edition of Insectivorous Plants (1888) after his father's death. Their experiments showed that the coleoptile of a young grass seedling directs its growth toward the light by comparing the responses of seedlings with covered and uncovered coleoptiles. These observations would later lead to the discovery of auxin.

Darwin was nominated by his father to the Linnean Society of London in 1875, and was elected as a Fellow of the Society on 2 December 1875. He was elected a Fellow of the Royal Society on 8 June 1882, the same year in which his father died. Darwin edited The Autobiography of Charles Darwin (1887), and produced some books of letters from the correspondence of Charles Darwin; The Life and Letters of Charles Darwin (1887) and More Letters of Charles Darwin (1905). He also edited Thomas Huxley's On the Reception of the Origin of Species (1887).

Darwin was elected to the American Philosophical Society in 1909. That same year, Cambridge University awarded him an honorary doctorate (DSc). He also received honorary doctorates from Dublin, Liverpool, Sheffield, Brussels, St Andrews, Upsala, and Prague. He was knighted in 1913.

He is buried in Cambridge. His daughter, Frances Cornford, was later buried with him.

== Family ==
Darwin was married three times and widowed twice. First, he married Amy Richenda Ruck in 1874, but she died in 1876 four days after the birth of their son Bernard Darwin, who was later to become a golf writer. She was buried in Holy Trinity Church, Corris, North Wales. According to a letter written by Charles Darwin to his close friend, Joseph Dalton Hooker: " I never saw anyone suffer so much as poor Frank. He has gone to N. Wales to bury the body in a little church-yard amongst the mountains".

He married his second wife, Ellen Wordsworth Crofts, in 1883. She was a Fellow and lecturer at Newnham College. She was also a member of the Ladies Dining Society in Cambridge. She died in 1903, and was buried in the churchyard of St. Andrew's Church, Girton. They had a daughter Frances Crofts Darwin, a poet who married the poet Francis Cornford and became known under her married name.

In 1913, he married his third wife, Lady Florence Henrietta Fisher, daughter of Herbert William Fisher and widow of Frederic William Maitland. She died in 1920 and is interred in the Parish of the Ascension Burial Ground, Cambridge, opposite the grave of Sir Francis Darwin and his daughter Frances Cornford. Her sister Adeline Fisher was the first wife of Darwin's double first cousin once removed Ralph Vaughan Williams.

== Publications ==
- Life and Letters of Charles Darwin (1880); (revised 2nd edition, 1887); 2nd printing of revised edition, 1888
- The Power of Movement in Plants (1880)
- The Practical Physiology of Plants (1894)
- Elements of Botany (1895)
- Rustic Sounds and Other Studies in Literature and Natural History (1917)

== See also ==
- Dorothea Pertz with whom he coauthored five papers
