= Florence Henrietta Darwin =

English playwright (1864–1920)

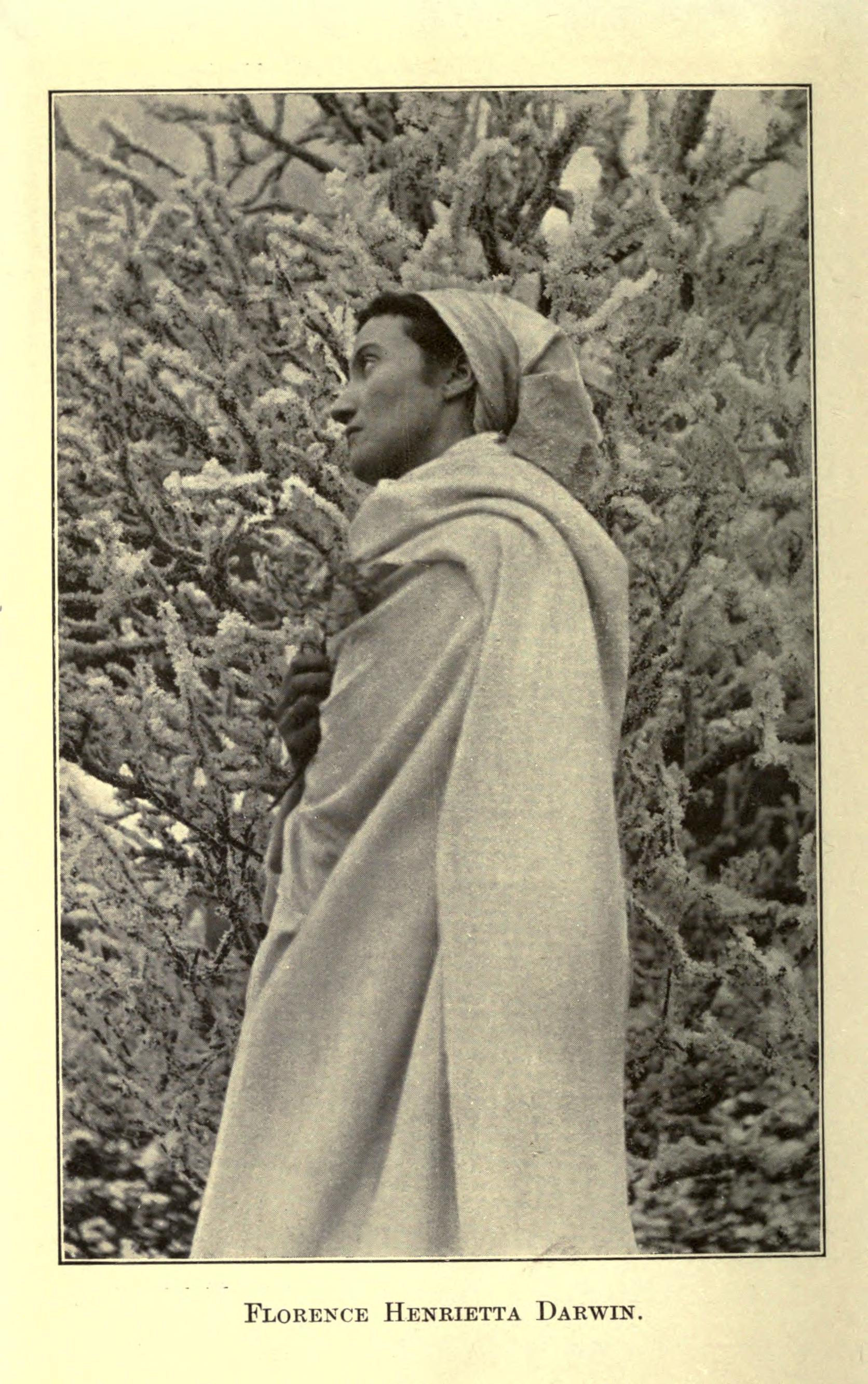
Portrait of Florence Henrietta Darwin, from the frontispiece of her Six Plays.

Florence Henrietta Darwin, Lady Darwin (née Fisher, previously Maitland; 31 January 1864 – 5 March 1920), was an English playwright.

== Early life ==
Florence Henrietta Fisher was born in Kensington, London, to Herbert William Fisher and his wife Mary Louisa Jackson (1841–1916). Florence was sister to Herbert Fisher and Adeline Maria Fisher, first wife of Ralph Vaughan Williams. She was a first cousin of Virginia Woolf, her siblings Vanessa Bell and Adrian Stephen and half-siblings George Herbert Duckworth and Gerald Duckworth through her aunt Julia and of William Wyamar Vaughan through her aunt Adeline.

As a child, she posed for a series of photographic portraits by her great-aunt, Julia Margaret Cameron, including A Study of St John the Baptist.

In F. W. Maitland: a Child's-Eye View, her daughter Ermengard mentions Florence's "menagerie of animals, her hours of violin playing, her feeding of tramps and gypsies, her photography and pony-driving, her story-telling and play-writing," and her liking for Thackeray.

== Personal life ==
In 1886, she married Frederic William Maitland (1850–1906), with whom she had two daughters, Ermengard (1888–1968) and Fredegond (1889–1949). On 3 March 1913, she became the third wife of Sir Francis Darwin, a first cousin once removed (twice over) of her sister's husband, Ralph Vaughan Williams—the second Josiah Wedgwood and his wife Elizabeth being their shared ancestor on one side and Robert Darwin and his wife Susannah on the other.

She died on 5 March 1920 and was buried at the Ascension Parish Burial Ground, Cambridge, along with her second husband and his daughter, Frances Cornford.

== Works ==
In 1921, family friend Cecil Sharp posthumously published the compilation Six Plays, which included The New Year, The Seeds of Love, Princess Royal, My Man John, Bushes and Briars and The Lover's Tasks. A book entitled Green Broom was published in 1923.
