= Deaths in October 2013 =

The following is a list of notable deaths in October 2013.

Entries for each day are listed alphabetically by surname. A typical entry lists information in the following sequence:

- Name, age, country of citizenship and reason for notability, established cause of death, reference.

== October 2013 ==
=== 1 ===
- Rosemary Adey, 80, Australian softball player.
- Peter Broadbent, 80, English footballer, Alzheimer's disease.
- Arnold Burns, 83, American lawyer, Deputy Attorney General (1986–1988), cardiac arrest and complications from Parkinson's disease.
- Ellis Burton, 77, American baseball player (St. Louis Cardinals, Cleveland Indians, Chicago Cubs).
- Tom Clancy, 66, American author (The Hunt for Red October, Patriot Games, Rainbow Six), heart failure.
- John B. Duff, 82, American historian and academic administrator, president of Columbia College Chicago (1992–2000), Alzheimer's disease.
- Imero Fiorentino, 85, American lighting designer.
- Giuliano Gemma, 75, Italian actor, traffic collision.
- Marshall Lee Gore, 50, American murderer and rapist, execution by lethal injection.
- Israel Gutman, 90, Israeli historian.
- Arnold Lazarus, 81, South African psychologist.
- Juan José Linz, 87, Spanish sociologist.
- Silvino Silvério Marques, 95, Portuguese colonial administrator and a general of the Portuguese Army.
- Vladimir Miklyukov, 69, Russian mathematician.
- Ole Danbolt Mjøs, 74, Norwegian physician and politician, chairman of the Norwegian Nobel Committee (2003–2008).
- Martin O'Toole, 88, Irish politician, Senator (1977–1989), TD for Mayo West (1989–1992).
- Jim Rountree, 77, American CFL football player (Toronto Argonauts), cancer.

=== 2 ===
- Shun Akiyama, 83, Japanese literary critic, esophageal cancer.
- Benjamin Dwomoh, 78, Ghanaian football referee.
- Gottfried Fischer, 69, German psychologist.
- Gene B. Glick, 92, American philanthropist and builder.
- Hilton A. Green, 84, American assistant director (Psycho) and producer (Sixteen Candles).
- Herbert O. House, 83, American organic chemist.
- Herman Hugg, 92, American artist.
- Jonathan Kaufer, 58, American film and television writer and director, traffic collision.
- Abraham Nemeth, 94, American mathematician and inventor.
- Kaare Ørnung, 82, Norwegian pianist and music teacher.
- Drita Pelingu, 86, Albanian actress, academic and director, Merited Artist of Albania.
- Zdeněk Rytíř, 69, Czech lyricist, heart attack.
- Ann Wolpert, 70, American librarian, Director of MIT Libraries (since 1996).

=== 3 ===
- Sari Abacha, 34, Nigerian footballer (Kwara United).
- Sergei Belov, 69, Russian Olympic champion basketball player (1972), member of the Naismith Hall of Fame and FIBA Hall of Fame.
- Trevor Briggs, 67, English rugby league footballer (Castleford).
- Lisa Bufano, 40, American performance artist, suicide.
- Bob Chance, 73, American baseball player.
- Frank D'Rone, 81, American jazz musician, cancer.
- Amy Dombroski, 26, American professional cyclist.
- Bill Eppridge, 75, American photographer (Life), septic infection.
- Mike Gallagher, 72, American Olympic skier.
- Edwin Haslam, 81, British chemist.
- Masae Kasai, 80, Japanese Olympic champion volleyball player (1964), intracranial hemorrhage.
- Helen Klanderud, 76, American politician and psychologist, Mayor of Aspen, Colorado (2001–2007), stroke.
- Charlie McBride, 88, New Zealand rugby league player.
- Ernie Morgan, 86, English footballer (Gillingham).
- John William Potter, 94, American senior judge of the District Court for the Northern District of Ohio (1982–2013), Mayor of Toledo, Ohio (1961–1967).
- Ángeles Santos Torroella, 101, Spanish painter.
- Milton Schwebel, 99, American psychologist.
- Chuck Smith, 86, American pastor (Calvary Chapel Costa Mesa), lung cancer.
- Joan Thirsk, 91, British economic and social historian.

=== 4 ===
- John Cloudsley-Thompson, 92, British naturalist and army officer.
- Ulric Cross, 96, Trinidadian judge, diplomat and war hero.
- Akira Miyoshi, 80, Japanese composer, heart failure.
- Nicholas Oresko, 96, American World War II veteran, Medal of Honor recipient, complications from surgery.
- Harold Rudman, 88, English footballer (Burnley, Rochdale).
- Ștefan Stănculescu, 90, Romanian football coach.
- Võ Nguyên Giáp, 102, Vietnamese general and politician, Minister of Defence (1976–1980).
- Bojan Westin, 87, Swedish actress.
- Robert D. Young, 79, American politician.

=== 5 ===
- Ruth R. Benerito, 97, American scientist, inventor of wash-and-wear (permanent press) fabrics.
- Charles Castle, 74, South African-born British television producer and author.
- Erich Cviertna, 62, Czech football player and manager, cancer.
- Gaetano Fidanzati, 78, Italian crime boss (Sicilian Mafia).
- Hefina Headon, 83, Welsh community and human rights activist.
- Hugh Jackson, 95, British paediatrician and child safety campaigner.
- Carlo Lizzani, 91, Italian film director, screenwriter and critic, suicide by jumping.
- Jim McColl, 80, Australian rules footballer.
- Fred Mifflin, 75, Canadian politician and naval officer, MP for Bonavista—Trinity—Conception (1988–2000).
- Joe D. Montgomery, 95, American school administrator and politician, member of the Alaska House of Representatives (1979–1983).
- Daud Rahbar, 86, Pakistani author and academic.
- Yakkun Sakurazuka, 37, Japanese comedian and voice actor (Full Moon o Sagashite, Inazuma Eleven, Zettai Shounen), traffic collision.
- Branko Vidović, 91, Croatian Olympic swimmer (1948).
- Wang Kenan, 33, Chinese Olympic diver (2004), traffic collision.
- Butch Warren, 74, American jazz bassist, lung cancer.

=== 6 ===
- Abdul Nasser Bani Hani, Jordanian politician, member of the House of Representatives (2010–2013), shot.
- James Leatham Tennant Birley, 85, English psychiatrist.
- Ulysses Curtis, 87, American CFL football player (Toronto Argonauts).
- Rift Fournier, 77, American writer and producer, cancer.
- Paul Gredinger, 85–86, Swiss architect.
- Cg'ose Ntcox'o, 62–63, Botswana artist, stroke.
- Will Ogdon, 92, American composer and academic.
- Paul Rogers, 96, English actor (Our Man in Havana, A Midsummer Night's Dream).
- Mary Scales, 85, American academic and politician.
- Andy Stewart, 76, British politician, MP for Sherwood (1983–1992).
- Nico van Kampen, 92, Dutch theoretical physicist and professor.

=== 7 ===
- Mick Buckley, 59, English footballer (Everton, Sunderland).
- Terry Burnham, 64, American actress.
- Giancarlo Cadè, 83, Italian Olympic football player and coach.
- Patrice Chéreau, 68, French film and opera director, lung cancer.
- Joanna Chmielewska, 81, Polish novelist and screenwriter.
- Yuri Churbanov, 76, Russian politician, First Deputy Minister of Internal Affairs of the Soviet Union (1980–1983).
- Basil Dickinson, 98, Australian Olympic athlete (1936).
- David E. Jeremiah, 79, American admiral, Vice Chairman of the Joint Chiefs of Staff (1990–1994).
- Ellen Lanyon, 86, American painter and printmaker.
- Dick LaPalm, 85, American music promoter and publicist.
- Annette Elizabeth Mahon, 94, Irish aviator.
- Bruce McPherson, 77, South African-born Australian jurist, Queensland Supreme Court Justice (1982–2006).
- Leandro Mendoza, 67, Filipino politician, Executive Secretary (2010), Secretary of Transportation and Communications (2002–2010), heart attack.
- Donna Norris, 78–79, American baseball player.
- Joe Rogers, 49, American politician, Lieutenant Governor of Colorado (1999–2003).
- Lars Erik Taxell, 100, Finnish legal scholar, rector of the Åbo Akademi University (1950–1957), leader of the Swedish People's Party of Finland (1955–1966).
- Ovadia Yosef, 93, Israeli Chief Rabbi (1973–1983), multiple organ failure.

=== 8 ===
- Philip Chevron, 56, Irish musician (The Pogues), esophageal cancer.
- David Clark, 94, English cricketer and administrator.
- Paul Desmarais, 86, Canadian businessman.
- José Faria, 80, Brazilian football coach.
- Rod Grams, 65, American politician and television news anchor (KMSP), member of the U.S. House of Representatives (1993–1995) and Senate (1995–2001), cancer.
- Helissio, 20, French thoroughbred racehorse, winner of the 1996 Prix de l'Arc de Triomphe, heart attack.
- Rodolphe Kasser, 86, Swiss Coptic scholar and archaeologist.
- Andy Pafko, 92, American baseball player (Chicago Cubs, Brooklyn Dodgers, Milwaukee Braves).
- Stan Paterson, 89, British-born Canadian glaciologist.
- Metro Prystai, 85, Canadian ice hockey player (Chicago Blackhawks, Detroit Red Wings).
- Akong Rinpoche, 73, Tibetan-born British Buddhist teacher and author, stabbed.
- Rottyful Sky, 25, South Korean pop singer, brain tumor.
- Khady Sylla, 50, Senegalese writer.
- Larry Verne, 77, American singer, Alzheimer's disease.
- Elena Volkova, 98, Ukrainian painter.

=== 9 ===
- Brandon Bailey, 80, Trinidad and Tobago Olympic weightlifter.
- Norma Bengell, 78, Brazilian actress and film director, lung cancer.
- Maximiano Tuazon Cruz, 90, Filipino Roman Catholic prelate, Bishop of Calbayog (1994–1999).
- Stanley Kauffmann, 97, American author, editor and film critic (The New Republic), pneumonia.
- Hugo Kindersley, 3rd Baron Kindersley, 84, British aristocrat and businessman.
- Jillian Lane, 52, British celebrity psychic, liver disease.
- Joop Langhorst, 70, Dutch footballer (Sparta Rotterdam), won KNVB Cup (1966–1967).
- Solomon Lar, 80, Nigerian politician, Governor of Plateau State (1979–1983).
- António Baltasar Marcelino, 83, Portuguese Roman Catholic prelate, Auxiliary Bishop of Lisbon (1975–1983), Bishop of Aveiro (1988–2006).
- Wilfried Martens, 77, Belgian politician, Prime Minister (1979–1981, 1981–1992), pancreatic cancer.
- Milan Matulović, 78, Serbian chess grandmaster.
- Darris McCord, 80, American football player (Detroit Lions).
- Seymour Mullings, 82, Jamaican politician and diplomat, Deputy Prime Minister (1993–2001), Ambassador to the United States (2001–2004).
- Edmund Niziurski, 88, Polish author.
- Mark "Chopper" Read, 58, Australian crime figure and author, liver cancer.
- Srihari, 49, Indian Tollywood film actor, liver malfunction.
- Robert Struckl, 95, Austrian Olympic sprinter.
- Monica Turner, 88, English ornithologist.

=== 10 ===
- Joop Cabout, 85, Dutch Olympic water polo player (1952) and 1950 European Champion.
- Scott Carpenter, 88, American test pilot, astronaut and aquanaut, complications from a stroke.
- Edward H. Clarke, 73, American Senior Economist.
- Tomoyuki Dan, 50, Japanese actor (Kamen Rider W) and voice actor (Naruto, Mobile Suit Victory Gundam), aortic dissection.
- Daniel Duval, 68, French film actor, director and writer.
- Joseph Gomer, 93, American pilot (Tuskegee Airman), cancer.
- Jan Kuehnemund, 50, American musician (Vixen), cancer.
- Jay Conrad Levinson, 80, American business writer.
- Godfrey Lightbourn, 83, Bahamian Olympic sailor.
- Walter P. Lomax Jr., 79–80, American medical practitioner.
- Norrie Martin, 74, Scottish footballer (Rangers).
- Joseph Fielding McConkie, 72, American academic and author.
- Sohei Miyashita, 85, Japanese politician.
- Emilio Molinero Hurtado, 93, Mexican potter.
- Kumar Pallana, 94, Indian actor (The Royal Tenenbaums, The Terminal, Romance & Cigarettes) and vaudeville performer.
- Kazem Sarikhani, 35, Iranian Olympic judoka (2000), Asian champion (2000), brain damage.
- Herry Janto Setiawan, 40, Indonesian Olympic cyclist.
- Jim Shumate, 91, American bluegrass musician.
- Cal Smith, 81, American country singer ("The Lord Knows I'm Drinking", "Country Bumpkin").
- Antoine Vergote, 91, Belgian priest and theologian.
- Georg Weinhold, 78, German Roman Catholic prelate, Auxiliary Bishop of Dresden-Meissen (1973–2008).
- Zheng Tianxiang, 99, Chinese politician and judge, President of the Supreme People's Court (1983–1988).

=== 11 ===
- Colleen Bevis, 97, American children's advocate.
- María de Villota, 34, Spanish racing driver, cardiac arrest.
- Wadih El Safi, 91, Lebanese singer-songwriter and actor.
- Margarita Ferrá de Bartol, 78, Argentine politician, member of the Chamber of Deputies for San Juan Province (2009–2013), helicopter crash.
- Stu Gilliam, 80, American actor and comedian.
- Christine Jackson, 71, British human rights campaigner, cancer.
- Johnny Kovatch, 101, American football player (Cleveland Rams).
- Erich Priebke, 100, German Nazi SS captain and war criminal.
- Terry Rhoads, 61, American actor (Liar Liar, Hitchcock, The Day After Tomorrow), amyloidosis.
- William H. Sullivan, 90, American diplomat, Ambassador to Laos (1964–1969), the Philippines (1973–1977) and Iran (1977–1979).
- Toshio Udō, 87, Japanese writer and critic, pneumonia.

=== 12 ===
- Jacques Charland, 83, Canadian Olympic ski jumper.
- Glen Dell, 51, South African aerobatics pilot, airshow crash.
- George Herbig, 93, American astronomer and academic.
- Oscar Hijuelos, 62, American novelist (The Mambo Kings Play Songs of Love), winner of Pulitzer Prize (1990), heart attack.
- Eero Koivumäki, 89, Finnish Olympic rower.
- Lesław Kropp, 76, Polish Olympic wrestler.
- Lin Youren, 75, Chinese musician.
- Ulf Linde, 84, Swedish art critic, writer and museum director, member of the Swedish Academy.
- Hans Wilhelm Longva, 71, Norwegian diplomat, cancer.
- Owe Lostad, 91, Swedish Olympic rower (1960).
- Martiens Louw, 75, South African rugby union player, coach and administrator.
- Michelle Madoff, 85, Canadian-born American politician, member of the Pittsburgh City Council (1978–1993).
- Eduard Martsevich, 76, Soviet and Russian film and theater actor, cirrhosis.
- Patsy Norvell, 70–71, American artist.
- Malcolm Renfrew, 103, American polymer chemist and inventor.
- Mann Rubin, 85, American screenwriter (The First Deadly Sin, The Mod Squad, Barnaby Jones).

=== 13 ===
- Olga Aroseva, 87, Russian actress.
- Martin Drewes, 94, German military pilot, World War II flying ace.
- Augusta Clark, 81, American politician, lawyer and librarian, member of the Philadelphia City Council (1980–2000).
- Rosalie Gower, 82, Canadian women's rights advocate, complications of a stroke.
- Bob Green, 91, American jazz pianist and bandleader.
- Jessica Huntley, 86, Guyanese-born British publisher.
- Dottie Berger MacKinnon, 71, American children's advocate.
- Joe Meriweather, 59, American basketball player (Kansas City Kings).
- Angela Moldovan, 86, Romanian singer and actress (Veronica), Order of the Star of Romania recipient, cardiac arrest.
- Tatsuo Ozawa, 96, Japanese politician (Minister of Welfare).
- Mario Picone, 87, American baseball player (New York Giants, Cincinnati Redlegs).
- Graham Reynolds, 99, British art historian.
- Philippos Syrigos, 65, Greek sports journalist, cancer.
- David Thomson, 88, Australian politician, member of the House of Representatives (1975–1983).
- Tommy Whittle, 87, British jazz saxophonist, pneumonia.
- Takashi Yanase, 94, Japanese cartoonist (Anpanman), heart failure.

=== 14 ===
- Wally Bell, 48, American baseball umpire, heart attack.
- José Borello, 83, Argentine footballer.
- Max Cahner, 76, Spanish Catalan politician and writer.
- James Joseph Daly, 92, American Roman Catholic prelate, Auxiliary Bishop of Rockville Centre (1977–1996).
- Bob Elliott, 85, Canadian politician and scientist.
- Kōichi Iijima, 83, Japanese poet, malabsorption syndrome.
- Josef Majer, 88, Czechoslovak football player.
- Pauke Meijers, 79, Dutch footballer (Feyenoord), Alzheimer's disease.
- Bruno Metsu, 59, French football player and coach (Senegal, United Arab Emirates), colorectal cancer.
- Käty van der Mije-Nicolau, 73, Romanian-born Dutch chess grandmaster, cardiac arrest.
- Frank Moore, 67, American performance artist, pleural pneumonia.
- Ryōzō Nagashima, 77, Japanese editor and translator, heart failure.
- Maxine Powell, 98, American etiquette instructor (Motown).

=== 15 ===
- Tommy Andersson, 50, Swedish actor.
- Donald Bailey, 80, American jazz drummer.
- Ian Douglas-Wilson, 101, British physician and editor (The Lancet).
- Nevill Drury, 66, English-born Australian author and publisher, liver failure.
- Sean Edwards, 26, British racing driver, racetrack collision.
- El Brazo, 52, Mexican professional wrestler, complications of diabetes.
- Rudolf Friedrich, 90, Swiss politician, member of the Federal Council (1982–1984).
- Cancio Garcia, 75, Filipino jurist, Associate Justice of the Supreme Court (2004–2007), heart attack.
- Harry Hughes, 84, English professional footballer.
- Arsala Jamal, 47, Afghan provincial governor, bombing.
- Eugène Georges Joseph Lecrosnier, 90, French Roman Catholic prelate, Bishop of Belfort-Montbéliard (1979–2000).
- Jack Lynn, 86, British architect.
- Gloria Lynne, 83, American jazz vocalist, heart attack.
- Rudy Minarcin, 83, American baseball player (Cincinnati Redlegs, Boston Red Sox).
- George Olesen, 88, American comic strip artist (The Phantom).
- Gustav Ranis, 83, American economist and emeritus professor at Yale.
- Hans Riegel, 90, German entrepreneur (Haribo).
- Rodolfo Rivademar, 85, Argentine Olympic silver-medalist sailor (1948).
- Pat Ryan, 61, New Zealand boxer.
- Reiner Schilling, 70, German Olympic wrestler.

=== 16 ===
- Albert Bourlon, 96, French racing cyclist.
- Govind Purushottam Deshpande, 74, Indian playwright and academic.
- Charles Halton, 81, British-born Australian mathematician and civil servant.
- George Hourmouziadis, 81, Greek archaeologist.
- Ed Lauter, 74, American actor (The Rocketeer, Cujo, ER), mesothelioma.
- Kate Losinska, 81, British trade unionist.
- Laurel Martyn, 97, Australian ballerina and choreographer.
- Robert Rheault, 87, American army officer (Project GAMMA).
- Samuel Reid Spencer Jr., 94, American academic administrator.
- Aurelia Szőke-Tudor, 78, Romanian world champion handball player (1962).
- Saggy Tahir, 68, Indian-born American politician, natural causes.
- David Frederick Wertz, 97, American prelate, Bishop of the United Methodist Church.
- Ye Duzheng, 97, Chinese meteorologist.

=== 17 ===
- George A. Blair, 98, American businessman, entrepreneur and waterskier.
- Henry C. Boren, 92, American historian.
- Antonia Brenner, 86, American nun.
- Giorgio Dellagiovanna, 72, Italian footballer.
- Terry Fogerty, 69, British rugby league player.
- Ronald Frankish, 90, Australian cricketer.
- Giant George, 7, American Great Dane, world's tallest dog.
- Guardian Sein Win, 91, Burmese journalist and advocate of freedom of the press.
- Antonio Guidi, 85, Italian actor and voice actor.
- Jameh Jameh, 58–59, Syrian general, shot.
- Arthur Maxwell House, 87, Canadian neurologist and politician, Lieutenant-Governor of Newfoundland and Labrador (1997–2002).
- Harbhajan Singh Rissam, 62, Indian cardiologist.
- Lou Scheimer, 84, American television producer (He-Man, Fat Albert, Star Trek: The Animated Series), co-founder of Filmation, Parkinson's disease.
- Rene Simpson, 47, Canadian tennis player, brain cancer.
- Take Control, 6, American Thoroughbred racehorse, euthanized.
- Erica Vaal, 85–86, Austrian actress, writer, radio host and presenter.
- Sarojini Varadappan, 92, Indian social worker.

=== 18 ===
- Francisco Rafael Arellano Félix, 63, Mexican drug lord, shot.
- Ravuri Bharadhwaja, 86, Indian Telugu language writer.
- Mary Carver, 89, American actress (The Shadow Box, Simon & Simon).
- Felix Dexter, 52, British comedian (The Real McCoy), multiple myeloma.
- Charlie Dickson, 79, Scottish footballer (Dunfermline Athletic).
- Mac Elvis, 25, Ugandan gospel musician and music producer, drowning.
- Hans Ephraimson-Abt, 91, German-born American businessperson and advocate for the victims of aviation accidents, heart failure.
- Tom Foley, 84, American politician and diplomat, Speaker of the House of Representatives (1989–1995), Ambassador to Japan (1997–2001), complications from a stroke.
- Norman Geras, 70, British political theorist and author, emeritus professor of politics (University of Manchester).
- Michael Harvey, 82, British lettering artist.
- Roland Janes, 80, American rockabilly guitarist and record producer.
- Robert Mazer, 90, American industrialist, Chicago White Sox owner.
- Marie McDonough, 95, Australian cricketer.
- Bum Phillips, 90, American football coach (Houston Oilers, New Orleans Saints).
- Alexander James Quinn, 81, American Roman Catholic prelate, Auxiliary Bishop of Cleveland (1983–2008).
- Charles A. Sorber, 74, American civil engineer, engineering professor, and academic administrator.
- Allan Stanley, 87, Canadian Hall of Fame ice hockey player, four-time Stanley Cup winner (1962, 1963, 1964, 1967).
- Bill Young, 82, American politician, member of the House of Representatives from Florida (since 1971), complications from back injury.

=== 19 ===
- John Bergamo, 73, American percussionist and composer.
- Georges Descrières, 83, French actor (Arsène Lupin), cancer.
- Vladimir Eljanov, 62, Ukrainian chess master and trainer.
- Hilda Hänchen, 94, German physicist.
- Manuel Haro, 82, Spanish footballer.
- Noel Harrison, 79, British singer ("The Windmills of Your Mind"), actor (The Girl From U.N.C.L.E.) and Olympic skier, heart attack.
- Ronald Shannon Jackson, 73, American percussionist, leukemia.
- Vladimir Keilis-Borok, 92, Russian mathematical geophysicist and seismologist.
- Zubaida Khanum, 78, Pakistani singer.
- Kurt Kurz, 86, Austrian Olympic ice hockey player.
- Jon Locke, 86, American actor (Land of the Lost), complications from a stroke.
- William C. Lowe, 72, American businessman, involved in development of IBM PC.
- Rosario Martinelli, 72, Italian professional football player.
- Nosratollah Momtahen, 89, Iranian Olympic sport shooter.
- Jakkrit Panichpatikum, 40, Thai sport shooter, shot.
- Y. Radhakrishnamurthy, 85, Indian politician, member of the Rajya Sabha (1996–2002).
- K. Raghavan, 99, Indian Malayalam film music composer.
- Mikihiko Renjō, 65, Japanese novelist, cancer.
- Geoff Smith, 85, English footballer (Bradford City).
- Viktor Tsybulenko, 83, Ukrainian Olympic champion javelin thrower (1960).
- Mahmoud Zoufonoun, 93, Iranian traditional musician, Alzheimer's disease.

=== 20 ===
- Yukichi Amano, 80, Japanese columnist, interstitial lung disease.
- Leon Ashley, 77, American country music singer.
- Bruce Beeby, 91, Australian actor (Journey into Space).
- Thomas Blondeau, 35, Flemish writer and poet, aortic rupture.
- Jovanka Broz, 88, Yugoslav army officer, First Lady (1953–1980), widow of Josip Broz Tito.
- Dullahan, 4, American Thoroughbred racehorse, euthanized.
- Dimiter Gotscheff, 70, German theatre director.
- Stephen S. Gottlieb, 77, American politician, heart failure.
- Bernardo Filipe Governo, 74, Mozambican Roman Catholic prelate, Bishop of Quelimane (1976–2007).
- Martin Greenberg, 95, American book publisher.
- Don James, 80, American football coach (University of Washington), pancreatic cancer.
- David Jimenez, 74, Puerto Rican American professional golfer, Alzheimer's disease.
- Jamalul Kiram III, 75, Filipino politician, claimant to the Sultanate of Sulu, multiple organ failure.
- Lawrence Klein, 93, American economist, predicted post-World War II economic boom, laureate of Nobel Prize in Economic Sciences (1980).
- Nikolai Kopnin, 67, Russian physicist.
- Alain Lascoux, 69, French mathematician.
- Kurt Lindlgruber, 78, Austrian sprint canoeist.
- Michael Locke, 84, English-born Canadian biologist.
- Émile Louis, 79, French murderer.
- Vallachira Madhavan, 79, Malayalam novelist and short story writer.
- Herman Makkink, 75, Dutch sculptor, graphic artist and illustrator.
- Ray Martynuik, 63, Canadian ice hockey player.
- Imre Nagy, 80, Hungarian Olympic champion modern pentathlete (1960).
- Pierre Page, 86, Swiss Olympic athlete.
- Warner R. Schilling, 88, American political scientist.
- Joginder Singh, 81, Kenyan rally driver.
- Bobby Thomas, 80, American jazz drummer.
- Larri Thomas, 81, American actress (Million Dollar Mermaid, The Silencers, Love Me or Leave Me), fall.
- Sid Yudain, 90, American journalist, founder of Roll Call.
- Dmitri Zaikin, 81, Russian engineer and cosmonaut trainer.

=== 21 ===
- Bud Adams, 90, American businessman, owner of the Tennessee Titans, natural causes.
- Aldo Bolzan, 80, Luxembourgish cyclist.
- Gianni Ferrio, 88, Italian composer, conductor and music arranger.
- Keryn Jordan, 37, South African footballer (Auckland City), cancer.
- Munawwar Ali Khan, 88, Pakistani cricketer.
- Mohammed Vizarat Rasool Khan, 66, Indian educationalist and politician.
- Rune T. Kidde, 56, Danish writer, storyteller, musician and artist.
- Frank Lima, 74, American poet.
- Irma Lozano, 69, Mexican actress, mouth cancer.
- Stuart McGee, 72–73, Irish priest.
- Colonel Robert Morris, 58, American musician, complications of a heart attack.
- Major Owens, 77, American politician, member of the House of Representatives for New York (1983–2007).
- Bohdan Przywarski, 81, Polish Olympic basketball player.
- Jackie Rea, 92, Northern Irish snooker player.
- Kanjuro Shibata XX, 92, Japanese bowmaker and kyūdō teacher.
- Karl Sim, 89, New Zealand artist and art forger.
- Karen Sogn, 82, Norwegian politician, member of the Storting from Vestfold (1977–1985).
- Ng Yuk Tim, 15, Malaysian murder victim.
- Dick van den Polder, 79, Dutch footballer (S.B.V. Excelsior).
- Oscar Yanes, 86, Venezuelan author.

=== 22 ===
- Oriol Bohigas Martí, 75, Spanish and French physicist.
- Helen Breger, 95, Austrian-born American visual artist, educator
- Mark Clarke, 63, Caymanian Olympic sailor.
- Marylou Dawes, 80, Canadian concert pianist.
- Lajos Für, 82, Hungarian politician and historian, Minister of Defence (1990–1994).
- William Harrison, 79, American author and screenwriter (Rollerball), kidney failure.
- Hou Renzhi, 101, Chinese geographer.
- Joseph H. Hulse, 90, Canadian biochemist, food technologist and writer.
- Théophile Georges Kassab, 68, Syrian Syriac Catholic hierarch, Archbishop of Homs (since 2000).
- Yanwari Kazama, 36, Japanese cartoonist, liver failure.
- Antonio Márquez Ramírez, 77, Mexican football referee.
- Shizuka Murayama, 94, Japanese-French painter.
- Kadir Özcan, 61, Turkish football player and coach, cardiac arrest.
- James Robinson Risner, 88, American airman.
- Nauman Shabbir, 59, Pakistani cricketer.
- Mark Small, 45, American baseball player (Houston Astros).
- Piotr Wala, 76, Polish Olympic ski-jumper.

=== 23 ===
- Suleiman Arabiyat, 74–75, Jordanian academic and politician, Agriculture Minister (1989–1990).
- Wes Bialosuknia, 68, American basketball player (University of Connecticut, Oakland Oaks).
- Parcelle Bop, 66, Nauruan politician, MP (1984–1986).
- Anthony Joseph Burgess, 75, Australian Roman Catholic prelate, Bishop of Wewak (2002−2013).
- Sir Anthony Caro, 89, British sculptor, heart attack.
- Bjørn Christoffersen, 86, Norwegian rower.
- Niall Donohue, 22, Irish hurler (Galway), suicide.
- Adrian Ettlinger, 88, American electrical engineer.
- John T. Gregorio, 85, American politician, member of the New Jersey General Assembly (1976−1978) and Senate (1978−1983), Mayor of Linden (1990−2006), leukemia.
- Dolores Lambaša, 32, Croatian actress, injuries sustained in traffic collision.
- Charles Letts, 95, English entrepreneur.
- E. Raymond Lynch, 90, American politician, member of the Pennsylvania House of Representatives (1979−1980).
- Gypie Mayo, 62, English rock guitarist (Dr. Feelgood, The Yardbirds) and songwriter ("Milk and Alcohol").
- Bill Mazer, 92, American sportscaster.
- Ettore Perego, 100, Italian Olympic gymnast (1948).
- Esteban Siller, 82, Mexican voice actor.
- Edward Thorne, 89, New Zealand navy chief of staff.

=== 24 ===
- Antonia Bird, 62, English television drama and film director, thyroid cancer.
- Manna Dey, 94, Indian playback singer, respiratory illness and renal failure.
- Manolo Escobar, 82, Spanish singer and actor.
- Brooke Greenberg, 20, American woman with rare slow-aging condition, bronchomalacia.
- Ben Haden, 88, American televangelist, broadcaster and CIA operative.
- Ana Bertha Lepe, 79, Mexican actress, Miss Mexico (1953).
- Boris Magaš, 83, Croatian architect and academic.
- Arthur Maling, 90, American author.
- Lew Mayne, 93, American football player.
- Raymond Mwanyika, 83, Tanzanian Roman Catholic prelate, Bishop of Njombe (1971−2002).
- Kadir Nurman, 80, Turkish-born German restaurateur, credited with inventing the doner kebab.
- Augusto Odone, 80, Italian economist and medical pioneer (Lorenzo's oil).
- Ebbe Parsner, 91, Danish Olympic rower (1948, 1952).
- Reggie Rogers, 49, American football player (Detroit Lions), cocaine and alcohol intoxication.
- Stephen Shepich, 65, American politician and former member of the Michigan House of Representatives in 1993 and 1994.
- Henry Taylor, 80, English racing driver.
- Deborah Turbeville, 81, American fashion photographer, lung cancer.
- Vajirañāṇasaṃvara, 100, Thai Buddhist monk, Supreme Patriarch of Thailand (since 1989).
- Zuzzurro, 67, Italian actor and comedian, lung cancer.

=== 25 ===
- Ron Ackland, 78, New Zealand rugby league player and coach.
- Pauline M. Clerk, 78, Ghanaian civil servant, natural causes.
- Jenny Dalenoord, 95, Dutch illustrator of children's books and cartoon artist.
- Arthur Danto, 89, American philosopher and art critic.
- Nigel Davenport, 85, English actor (Chariots of Fire, Howards' Way, A Man for All Seasons).
- Friedrich Fetz, 85, Austrian Olympic gymnast.
- Roy Grantham, 86, British trade unionist, General Secretary of APEX (1971–1989).
- Bill Gulick, 97, American author and historian.
- Sir Nicholas Hunt, 82, British admiral.
- Tokiko Iwatani, 97, Japanese lyricist, pneumonia.
- Arne Johansen, 86, Norwegian Olympic speed skater (1952).
- Dan Laksov, 73, Norwegian mathematician and human rights activist.
- Piero Mazzarella, 85, Italian actor.
- Tommy McConville, 67, Irish footballer.
- Paddy McFarlane, 81, New Zealand footballer.
- Ray Melikian, 95, American fighter pilot.
- Peter Mitterer, 66, Austrian politician, Senator (2005–2013), President of the Federal Council (2005, 2010).
- Hal Needham, 82, American film director (Smokey and the Bandit, The Cannonball Run, Hooper) and stuntman, cancer.
- Paul Reichmann, 83, Canadian businessman and real estate mogul (Olympia and York).
- Bill Sharman, 87, American Hall of Fame basketball player (Boston Celtics) and coach (Los Angeles Lakers), complications from a stroke.
- Lawrence Leighton Smith, 77, American conductor and pianist.
- Amparo Soler Leal, 80, Spanish actress, cardiac arrest.
- Sir William Tyree, 81, Australian engineer and businessman.
- Piero Tiberi, 66, Italian actor and voice actor.
- Chico Vaughn, 73, American basketball player (St. Louis Hawks, Detroit Pistons), cancer.
- Marcia Wallace, 70, American actress (The Simpsons, The Bob Newhart Show, That's My Bush!) and comedian, pneumonia.

=== 26 ===
- Ritva Arvelo, 92, Finnish actress, director and screenwriter.
- Gias Kamal Chowdhury, 74, Bangladeshi journalist.
- Ron Davies, 91, Welsh photographer.
- Denis Foley, 79, Irish politician, Teachta Dála (1981−1989, 1992−2002), Senator (1989−1992).
- Gabriel of Komana, 67, Belgian-born French Orthodox archbishop, cancer.
- Elza Furtado Gomide, 88, Brazilian mathematician.
- Doug Ireland, 67, American journalist and blogger.
- Al Johnson, 65, American soul singer (The Unifics).
- P. S. Manisundaram, 85, Indian academic.
- Andries Maseko, 58, South African footballer.
- Michael Neuberger, 59, British biochemist, myeloma.
- Points Offthebench, 4, American Thoroughbred racehorse, euthanized.

=== 27 ===
- Aldo Barbero, 76, Argentine actor.
- Jeanine Belkhodja, 85, Algerian doctor and activist.
- Julian Bennett, 84, American politician.
- Vinko Coce, 59, Croatian singer, complications from diabetes.
- Fred Creba, 68, New Zealand Paralympic sportsperson.
- Noel Davern, 67, Irish politician, Teachta Dála (1969−1981, 1987−2007), Member of the European Parliament (1979−1984), Minister for Education (1991−1992).
- Eddie Erautt, 89, American baseball player (Cincinnati Reds/Redlegs, St. Louis Cardinals).
- Olga Gyarmati, 89, Hungarian Olympic athlete (1948).
- Basil Hennessy, 88, Australian archaeologist.
- Leonard Herzenberg, 81, American immunologist and geneticist.
- F. Landa Jocano, 83, Filipino anthropologist.
- Luigi Magni, 85, Italian screenwriter and film director.
- Michael Mandel, 65, Canadian legal academic.
- Roger McGee, 86, American actor (Forbidden Planet).
- Darryn Randall, 32, South African cricketer (Border), head trauma.
- Lou Reed, 71, American rock musician (The Velvet Underground) and songwriter ("Walk on the Wild Side"), liver disease.
- Nir Shumsher Jung Bahadur Rana, 99, Nepalese field marshal.
- Albie Thomas, 78, Australian Olympic runner and world record holder.
- Sir Michael Wilkes, 73, British army general, Lieutenant Governor of Jersey (1995–2001).

=== 28 ===
- Nalini Ambady, 54, Indian social psychologist, leukemia.
- Adolphus Bell, 69, American electric blues musician, lung cancer.
- Bonfire, 30, German Olympic champion dressage horse (2000), euthanized following adrenal disease and hoof inflammation.
- Troy Clarke, 44, Australian football player, coronary atherosclerosis.
- Trygve Fjetland, 87, Norwegian businessperson.
- Marea Gazzard, 85, Australian sculptor and ceramicist.
- Tommy Gumina, 82, American jazz accordionist and musical instrument builder.
- Ferdinand Havlík, 85, Czech clarinetist and composer, co-founder of Semafor.
- Tetsuharu Kawakami, 93, Japanese baseball player and manager (Yomiuri Giants).
- Eunice Kazembe, 61, Malawian politician, Minister of Industry and Trade (2009–2012), Minister for Education (since 2012).
- Tadashi Maeda, 66, Japanese politician, member of the House of Representatives (1990–1993, 1996–2000), heart failure.
- Tadeusz Mazowiecki, 86, Polish politician, Prime Minister (1989–1991), member of the Sejm (1961–1972, 1991–2001).
- Layne Redmond, 61, American drummer and author, breast cancer.
- Ike Skelton, 81, American politician, member of the House of Representatives from Missouri (1977–2011), pneumonia.
- Aleksandar Tijanić, 64, Serbian journalist, general director of Radio Television of Serbia, heart attack.
- Rajendra Yadav, 84, Indian Hindi fiction writer.
- Mária Zalai-Kövi, 89, Hungarian Olympic gymnast.

=== 29 ===
- Allal Benkassou, 71, Moroccan Olympic footballer (FAR Rabat).
- Jaime Casagrande, 64, Brazilian footballer (Figueirense).
- Jean Rénald Clérismé, 75, Haitian politician, diplomat and priest, Foreign Minister (2006–2008).
- Stephen H. Crandall, 92, American mechanical engineer and academic.
- Sherman Halsey, 56, American music video director.
- Rudolf Kehrer, 90, Georgian-born German classical pianist.
- Ferdie le Grange, 65, South African plastic surgeon and marathon runner.
- Martha Longenecker, 93, American artist and academic, founded Mingei International Museum.
- Srđa Popović, 76, Serbian civil rights lawyer and activist.
- Sheikh Salahuddin, 44, Bangladeshi cricketer, cardiac arrest.
- John-David Schofield, 75, American Anglican prelate, Bishop of San Joaquin (1988–2011).
- João Rodrigo, 35, Brazilian footballer (Bangu, Östers, Madureira), murdered.
- John Spence, 95, American World War II veteran, first combat frogman (diver).
- Graham Stark, 91, English comedian and actor (The Pink Panther, Superman III, Alfie), stroke.
- Jan van de Ven, 88, Dutch politician, member of the House of Representatives (1976–1981).
- Wong Kim Poh, 79, Singaporean Olympic basketballer.

=== 30 ===
- Max Bléneau, 79, French cyclist.
- Lincoln P. Bloomfield, 93, American academic.
- Edward Chupa, 95, American football player and coach.
- Bill Currie, 84, American baseball player (Washington Senators).
- Leo Gravelle, 88, Canadian ice hockey player (Montreal Canadiens).
- Pete Haycock, 62, English guitarist (Climax Blues Band), heart attack.
- Marilyn E. Jacox, 84, American physicist.
- Dave MacFarlane, 46, Scottish footballer (Rangers, Kilmarnock).
- Ray Mielczarek, 67, Welsh footballer (Wrexham).
- Joaquín José Morón Hidalgo, 71, Venezuelan Roman Catholic prelate, Bishop of Valle de la Pascua (1992−2002) and Acarigua-Araure (since 2002), cancer.
- Michael Palmer, 71, American novelist, heart attack and stroke.
- Anca Petrescu, 64, Romanian architect and politician, MP (2004–2008), chief architect of the Palace of the Parliament, complications following traffic collision.
- J. R. Salamanca, 90, American author and academic.
- Frank Wess, 91, American jazz saxophonist and flautist, heart attack.

=== 31 ===
- April, 30, Belizean zoo tapir.
- John Benetti, 76, Australian rules footballer.
- Bruno Bertagna, 78, Italian Roman Catholic archbishop, Secretary (1994−2007) and Vice-President of Council for Legislative Texts (2007−2010).
- Toby Bluth, 73, American artist and animator (Alvin & the Chipmunks, The Smurfs).
- Walter Brown, 86, New Zealand actor.
- Radha Burnier, 89, Indian theosophist leader.
- Murray Cardiff, 79, Canadian politician.
- Chris Chase, 90, American actress (Killer's Kiss, All That Jazz), pancreatic cancer.
- Evelyn de Mille, 94, Canadian bookseller.
- Gérard de Villiers, 83, French thriller writer (Son Altesse Sérénissime), pancreatic cancer.
- Jagadish Ghimire, 67, Nepalese writer and development worker, cancer.
- Robert Gray, 68, American actor (Innerspace).
- Trees Huberts-Fokkelman, 79, Dutch politician, member of the Senate (1991–1995).
- Trevor Kletz, 91, British chemical engineer and safety consultant.
- Johnny Kucks, 80, American baseball player (New York Yankees, Kansas City Athletics), cancer.
- Henryk Markiewicz, 90, Polish historian.
- William Morris, 88, British Church of Scotland minister and author.
- Andres Narvasa, 84, Filipino lawyer and jurist, Chief Justice of the Supreme Court (1991−1998), pneumonia.
- Bobby Parker, 76, American blues-rock guitarist.
- K. P. Saxena, 81, Indian satirist and writer.
- Charles Suckling, 93, British biochemist.
