= Schwebel =

Schwebel is a surname. Notable people with the surname include:

- David Schwebel, American psychologist
- Milton Schwebel (1914–2013), American psychologist, pioneer in peace psychology
- Stephen M. Schwebel (1929–2026), American jurist and international judge, counsel, and arbitrator

== See also ==
- Schwebel's Bakery
