= Vladimir Miklyukov =

Vladimir Michaelovich Miklyukov
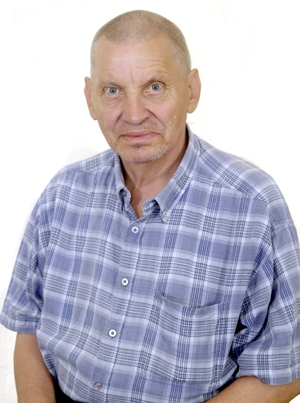
- Miklyukov, 2007
- Born: 8 January 1944
- Died: October 2013 (aged 69)
- Education: Donetsk National University
- Known for: founding Superslow Processes laboratory
- Awards: Distinguished Scientist of Russian Federation
- Scientific career
- Fields: Mathematics
- Workplaces: Volgograd State University; Brigham Young University
- Doctoral advisor: Georgy Dmitrievich Suvorov

Vladimir Michaelovich Miklyukov (Russian: Миклюков, Владимир Михайлович, also spelled Miklioukov or Mikljukov) (8 January 1944 – October 2013) was a Russian educator in mathematics, and head of the Superslow Process workgroup based at Volgograd State University.

== Biography ==
In 1970, as a student of Georgy D. Suvorov at Donetsk National University, he defended his Ph.D. thesis Theory of Quasiconformal Mappings in Space. In 1981 Miklyukov and his family moved to Volgograd. He was transferred to the newly built Volgograd State University where he became chairman of the Department of Mathematical Analysis and Theory of Functions.

His scientific research focused on geometrical analysis. At the same time, he was studying zero mean curvature surfaces in Euclidean and pseudo-Euclidean spaces, nonlinear elliptic type partial differential equations and quasiregular mappings of Riemannian manifolds. The main results of that work were related to the following groups of questions:

- The external geometrical structure of zero mean curvature surfaces in Euclidean and pseudo-euclidean spaces; spacelike tubes and bands of zero mean curvature, their stability and instability with respect to small deformations, their life-time, branches, connections between branch points and Lorentz invariant characteristics of surfaces;
- Phragmén-Lindelöf type theorems for differential forms; Ahlfors type theorems for differential forms with finite or infinite number of different asymptotic tracts; generalizations of Wiman theorem of forms, applications to quasiregular mappings on manifolds; applications of isoperimetric methods to the Phragmén–Lindelöf principle for quasiregular mappings on manifolds.

From 1998-2000 Miklyukov was a visiting professor at Brigham Young University. In 2009 Miklyukov was named a Distinguished Scientist of Russian Federation.

== Publications ==
- Miklyukov, Vladimir (2008). Introduction to Nonsmooth Analysis (PDF) (in Russian) (2 ed.). Volgograd: VolSU. ISBN 978-5-9669-0457-9. Archived from the original (PDF) on 2011-07-22.
- —— (2007). Geometrical Analysis. Differential Forms, Almost-solutions, Almost Quasiconformal Mappings (PDF) (in Russian). Volgograd: VolSU. ISBN 978-5-9669-0268-1.
- —— (2006). Introduction to Nonsmooth Analysis. Volgograd: VolSU. ISBN 5-9669-0209-7.
- —— (2005). Conformal Mapping of Irregular Surfaces and Its Application (PDF) (in Russian). Volgograd: VolSU. ISBN 5-9669-0071-X. Archived from the original (PDF) on 2011-07-22.
- Miklyukov, Vladimir; Klyachin, Vladimir A. (2004). Tubes and Bands in Space-Time. Anniversary series: The Scientists of the Volga (in Russian). Volgograd: VolSU. ISBN 5-85534-971-3.
