= Michael Locke =

Michael Locke may refer to:

- Michael Locke (biologist) (1929–2013), English-born Canadian biologist
- Michael Locke (stuntman) (1979–2026), member of the Dirty Sanchez crew
- Michael K. Locke (1952–2014), American politician
- Michael Lok (c.1532–c.1621), English merchant and traveller

== See also ==
- Michael Laucke (1947–2021), Canadian guitarist
