= L. B. Fischer Publishing Corporation =

The L. B. Fischer Publishing Corporation was an American publisher founded in 1942 by Gottfried B. Fischer and Fritz Landshoff. The full name of the firm was Landshoff Bermann Fischer Publishing.

== Foundation ==
Fischer and Landshoff, both exiles from Fascist Germany, had moved to New York City in 1941 and established their company in order to publish literary fictionand non-fiction by young writers. Special emphasis was placed on English translations of German writers who had emigrated. Fischer had been associated with the prestigious S. Fischer Verlag, and Landshoff with Querido publishers in Amsterdam.

== Significant publications ==
The first years saw significant publications like The American Harvest, an anthology including writers Willa Cather, Katherine Anne Porter, and E.E. Cummings.

Edwin Seaver edited an annual series called Cross Section, discovering for the first time writers like Norman Mailer, Richard Wright, Arthur Miller, and Tennessee Williams. The 1944 volume was reportedly selected from "over 1,000 manuscripts" by writers without substantial previous publications; it included six novelettes, two full-length plays, a "poetic drama", seventeen short stories, a critical essay, and twenty-six poems.

Klaus Mann and Hermann Kesten edited an anthology of German writing in English translation under the title The Turning Point.

In 1942, Fischer Publishing launched a series of short books designed to be authoritative introductions, in the paperback format, to various modern scientific fields. The board of editors included Alvin Johnson, director of the New School for Social Research; Harlow Shapley of Harvard University, and Alfred E. Cohn of the Rockefeller Institute.
