= Kazembe (disambiguation) =

Kazembe is a traditional kingdom in modern-day Zambia. Kazembe may also refer to

- Kazembe (Mwansabombwe), a town in Zambia
- Eunice Kazembe (1952–2013), Malawian politician
- Mihayo Kazembe (born 1976), football player from the Democratic Republic of the Congo
- Raphael Kazembe (born 1947), Malawian cyclist
