= List of ambassadors of Malawi to China =

Coordinates: 39.941699°N 116.446397°E

Ambassador of Malawi to China
- Incumbent; Charles Enoch Namondwe since September 19, 2008
- Inaugural holder: Eunice Kazembe
- Formation: 2000

The Malawian ambassador in Beijing is the official representative of the Government in Lilongwe to the Government of the People's Republic of China.

== List of representatives ==
Diplomatic agrément/ Diplomatic accreditation	ambassador	Observations	List of heads of state of Malawi	Premier of the People's Republic of China	Term end
July 6, 1964		Independence of Malawi	Hastings Kamuzu Banda	Yen Chia-kan	
August 1, 1966		The governments in Lilongwe and Taipai maintained diplomatic relations.	Hastings Kamuzu Banda	Yen Chia-kan	December 31, 2007
2000	Eunice Kazembe	The new mission in Taipei, Republic of China (Taiwan), was to be headed by Eunice Kazembe,	Bingu wa Mutharika	Chang Chun-hsiung	2004
2005	Thengo Maloya		Bingu wa Mutharika	Chang Chun-hsiung	December 15, 2007
December 15, 2007	Thengo Maloya	The Malawian Ambassador in Taipei, Thengo Maloya, was transferred to Beijing, but was soon replaced by a close presidential relative, Charles Namondwe.	Bingu wa Mutharika	Wen Jiabao	September 19, 2008
March 26, 2008		The government of Malawi opened an embassy in Beijing.	Bingu wa Mutharika	Wen Jiabao	
September 19, 2008	Charles Enoch Namondwe		Bingu wa Mutharika	Wen Jiabao	

- Malawi–Taiwan relations
