= Langhorst =

Langhorst may refer to:

- David Langhorst, American businessperson and politician in Idaho
- Fred Langhorst, American modernist architect
- Joop Langhorst (1943–2013), Dutch footballer
- Lois Wilson Langhorst (1914–1989), American modernist architect
