= Weinhold =

Weinhold is a surname. Notable people with the surname include:

- Adolf Ferdinand Weinhold (1841–1917), German chemist and physician
- Ashley Weinhold (born 1989), American tennis player
- Frank A. Weinhold (born 1941), American chemist, academic and author
- Georg Weinhold (1934−2013), German Roman Catholic bishop
- Jutta Weinhold (born 1947), German rock singer
- Karl Weinhold (1823–1901), German folklorist and linguist
- Matt Weinhold (born 1964), American comedian
- Max Weinhold (born 1982), German field hockey player (goalkeeper)
- Steffen Weinhold (born 1986), German handball player
- Werner Weinhold (1949–2024), German NVA soldier

== See also ==
- Wienhold
