= Eljanov =

Eljanov (Ukrainian: Ельянов) is a Ukrainian surname. Notable people with the surname include:

- Pavel Eljanov (born 1983), Ukrainian chess grandmaster, son of Vladimir
- Vladimir Eljanov (1951–2013), Ukrainian chess player and chess book publisher
