= Jennifer Rowsell =

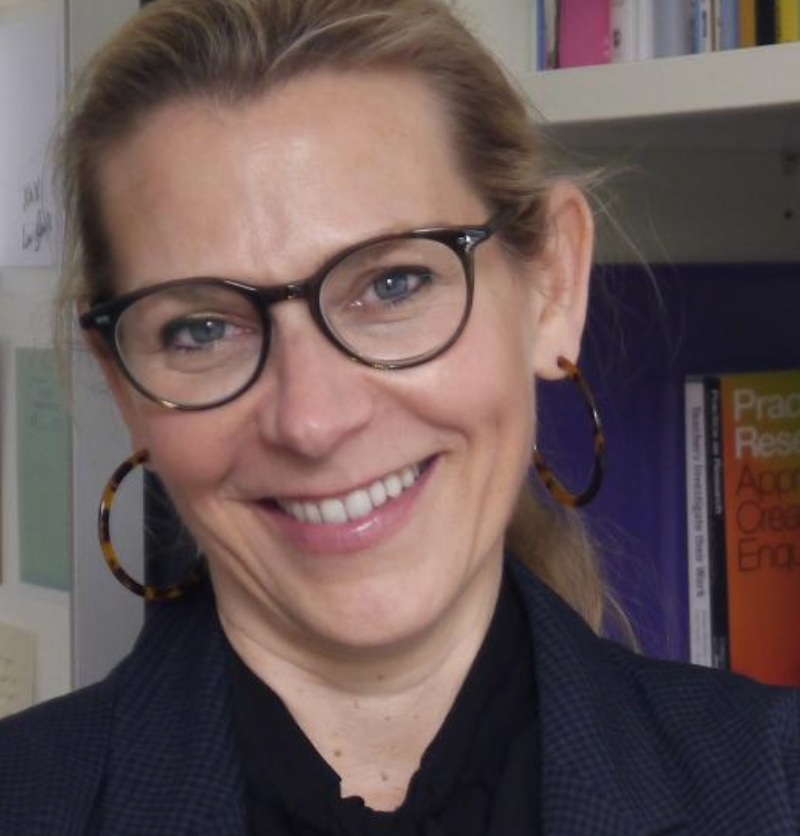
- Occupations: Professor of Digital Literacy and Director of Research and Innovation

Academic background
- Education: University of Toronto (HBA); University College London (MA); King's College London (PhD)

Academic work
- Discipline: Education scholar
- Sub-discipline: Digital literacy
- Institutions: University of Sheffield

Jennifer Rowsell is Professor of Digital Literacy and Director of Research and Innovation in the School of Education at the University of Sheffield. She is a multimodal ethnographer who conducts arts-based, digital, media and maker-driven research with children, young people, and adults. She has conducted research in primary and secondary schools across Australia, Canada, the United States and the United Kingdom.

== Academic career ==
Rowsell received her bachelor's degree from Victoria College at the University of Toronto in English literature. In 1992, she completed a teaching English as a foreign language (TEFL) diploma at Rutgers University in Paris, France. In 1994, she completed a master's degree in comparative literature at University College London, University of London, UK. In 2001, Rowsell received her PhD in Literacy Education at King's College London, UK under the supervision of Professor Brian Street. Her dissertation was titled Publishing Practices in Printed Education: British and Canadian Perspectives on Educational Publishing.

From 2001 to 2005, Rowsell worked as a contract lecturer at OISE, University of Toronto and coordinated of initial teacher education cohorts. In 2005, Rowsell moved to Rutgers Graduate School of Education in the United States for a tenure-track position as an assistant professor of English education.

In 2010, Rowsell was awarded a Tier 2 Canada Research Chair in Multiliteracies at Brock University, Canada. During this time, she launched and directed the CFI (Canada Foundation for Innovation)-funded Centre for Multiliteracies and the Brock Learning Lab. Over nine years, Rowsell secured external funding to conduct research on a range of topics such as: multimodal-arts-based approaches to the teaching of English literature; the nature and properties of digital reading; arts-based and participatory methods for literacy research; videogame and app research; materialist and sociomaterial research with children and young people; makerspace research; and, applying creative methods to explore children and young people's sensory, affective, and non-representational understandings of texts.

In 2019, Rowsell moved back to the UK as a professor of social innovation at the University of Bristol. In 2022, she then moved to the University of Sheffield. Professor Rowsell is Lead Editor of Reading Research Quarterly and she co-edits the Routledge Expanding Literacies in Education series with Dr. Carmen Media (Indiana University) and Professor Gerald Campano (University of Pennsylvania).

== Honours and awards ==
- Elected member of the inaugural cohort of the College of New Scholars, Artists, and Scientists of the Royal Society of Canada, September 2014
- Steve Witte Lifetime Achievement Award from the American Educational Research Association (AERA) Writing and Literacies SIG, 2016
- Michael Plyley Graduate Mentorship Award for Supervision, Mapping the New Knowledges, Brock University, Canada, April 2018
- With Cheryl McLean, the 2022 Divergent Award for Excellence in 21st Century Literacies Research from the National Council of Teachers of English (NCTE) for McLean, C., & Rowsell, J. (Eds). (2021). Maker Literacies and Maker Identities in the Digital Age: Learning and Playing through Modes and Media. New York: Routledge
- Co-Series Editor of the Routledge Expanding Literacies in Education book series with Carmen Medina and Gerald Campano
- Lead Editor of Reading Research Quarterly (from 2022 to 2027) with Cheryl McLean, Natalia Kucirkova, and Christian Ehret (Co-Editors)
- Co-Convenor with Clare Dowdall of the Everyday Literacies Special Interest Group, United Kingdom Literacy Association.

== Selected works ==
- Rowsell, J. (2025). The Comfort of Screens: Literacy in Post-Digital Times. Cambridge: Cambridge University Press.
- Pahl, K. & Rowsell, J. with D. Collier, S. Pool, Z. Rasool and T. Trzecak. (2020). Living Literacies: Literacy for Social Change. Boston: MIT Press.
- Rowsell, J. (2013). Working with Multimodality: Rethinking Literacy in a Digital Age. London: Routledge.
- Pahl, K. & Rowsell, J. (2012). Literacy and Education: Understanding the New Literacy Studies in the Classroom. Second Edition. London: Sage.
- Nichols, S., Rowsell, J., Nixon, H., &amp; Rainbird, S. (2012). Resourcing Early Learners: New Networks, New Actors. London: Routledge.
- Grenfell, M., Bloome, D., Hardy, C, Pahl, K., Rowsell, J. &amp; Street, B. (2012). Language, Ethnography, and Education: Bridging New Literacy Studies and Bourdieu. New York: Routledge.
- Sheridan, M. P. & Rowsell, J. (2010). Design Literacies: Learning and Innovation in the Digital Age. London: Routledge.
- Pahl, K. & Rowsell, J. (2010). Artifactual Literacies: Every Object Tells a Story. New York: Teachers College Press.

== Recent work ==
Rowsell's current research focus looks at digital literacy as a lived practice, as something that is a part of people's everyday and part of this work promotes criticality and disruption to platforms, AI, and data literacies. She has a book coming out on the topic entitled, The Comfort of Screens: Literacy in Postdigital Times (Cambridge University Press).
