= Denis Jachiet =

French Catholic bishop (born 1962)

- Bishop of Belfort-Montbéliard
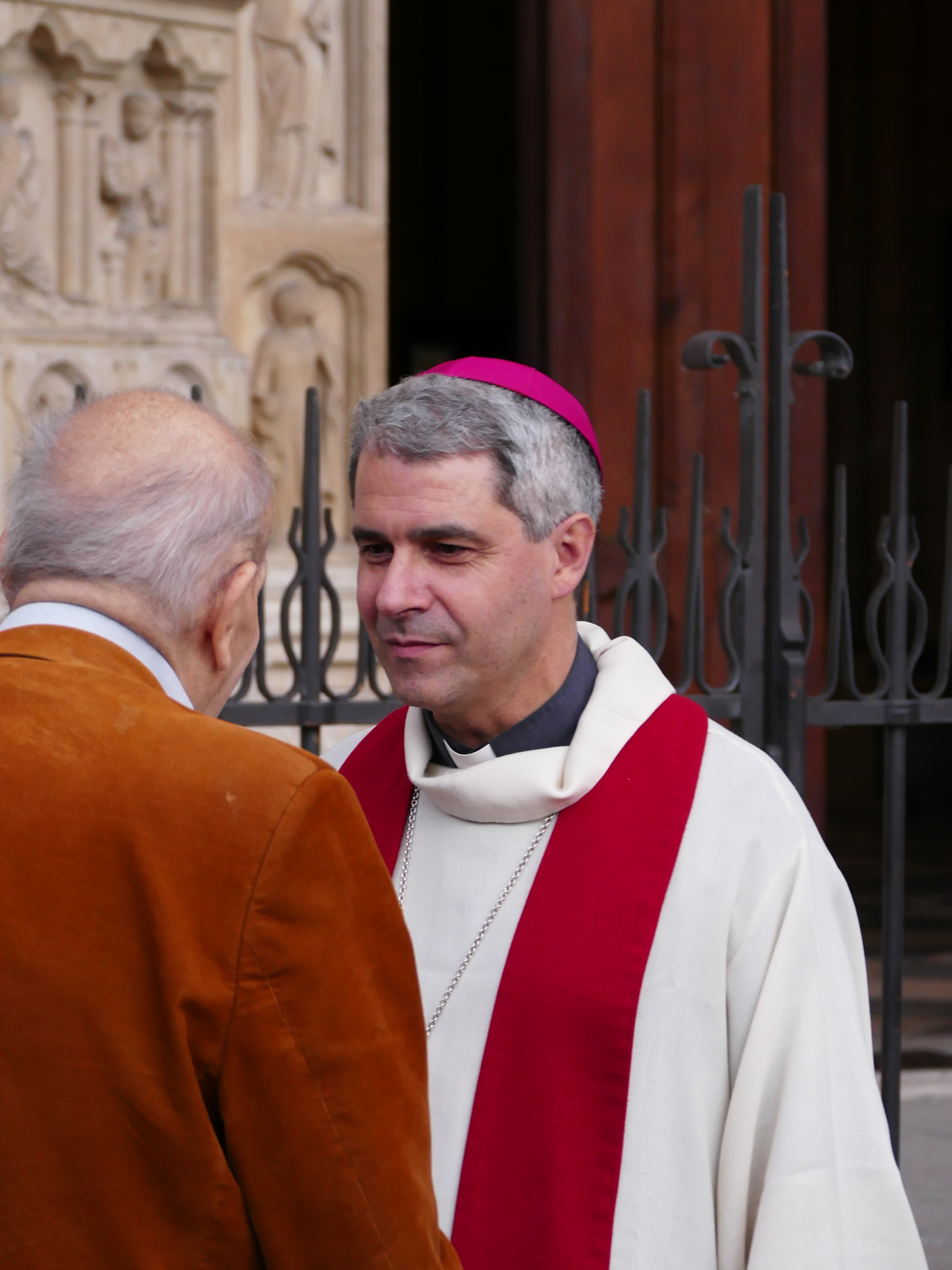
- Appointed: 2 October 2021
- Installed: 14 November 2021
- Predecessor: Dominique Blanchet
- Previous posts: Auxiliary bishop of Paris (2016–2021); Apostolic administrator of Saint-Dié (2022–2023)

Orders
- Ordination: 29 June 1996
- Consecration: 9 September 2016

Personal details
- Born: 21 April 1962 Paris, France

Denis Jachiet (born 21 April 1962) is a French prelate of the Catholic Church who has been bishop of Belfort-Montbéliard since 2021. He served as an auxiliary bishop of Paris from 2016 to 2021.

== Biography ==
Denis Jachiet was born in Paris on 21 April 1962. He graduated from the Ecole Nationale Superieure de Chimie in Paris and earned a doctorate in organic chemistry from the Paris VI University. He worked at the University of California, Los Angeles as a research scientist. He entered the seminary in Paris in 1990 and studied at the cathedral school there. He was ordained priest for the diocese of Paris on 29 June 1996. He continued his studies at the Institut d'études théologiques in Brussels in 1996/97, where he obtained his licentiate in theology.

He served as vicar of the parish of Notre-Dame-de-Grace de Passy and chaplain of the college and high school of Saint-Jean de Passy from 1997 to 2000; formator of the Seminary of Paris and teacher at the cathedral school from 2000 to 2014; head of the Maison Saint-Roch of the Seminary of Paris from 2000 to 2010; delegate for priestly and religious vocations from 2002 to 2009; member of the Priests Council from 2005 to 2016; director of the Maison Saint-Augustin at the Seminary of Paris from 2009 to 2010; parish priest of Saint-Séverin and Saint-Nicolas and head of the Maison Saint-Séverin of the Seminary of Paris from 2010 to 2014; diocesan chaplain of the Scouts unitaires de France for 2013/2014; and vicar general and titular canon of the Cathedral of Paris from 2014 to 2016.

On 25 June 2016 Pope Francis appointed Jachiet auxiliary bishop of Paris anc titular bishop of Tigisis in Numidia. He received his episcopal ordination on 9 September.

On 2 October 2021, he was appointed bishop of Belfort-Montbéliard. He was installed there on 14 November.

He served as apostolic administrator of the Diocese of Saint-Dié from September 2022 to February 2023.
