= Wienhold =

Wienhold is a surname. Notable people with the surname include:

- Günter Wienhold (1948–2021), German footballer
- Lutz Wienhold (born 1965), German footballer

== See also ==
- Weinhold
