= Belfort Cathedral =

Church in Belfort, France

Coordinates: 47°38′19″N 6°51′50″E

Belfort Cathedral Cathédrale Saint-Christophe de Belfort
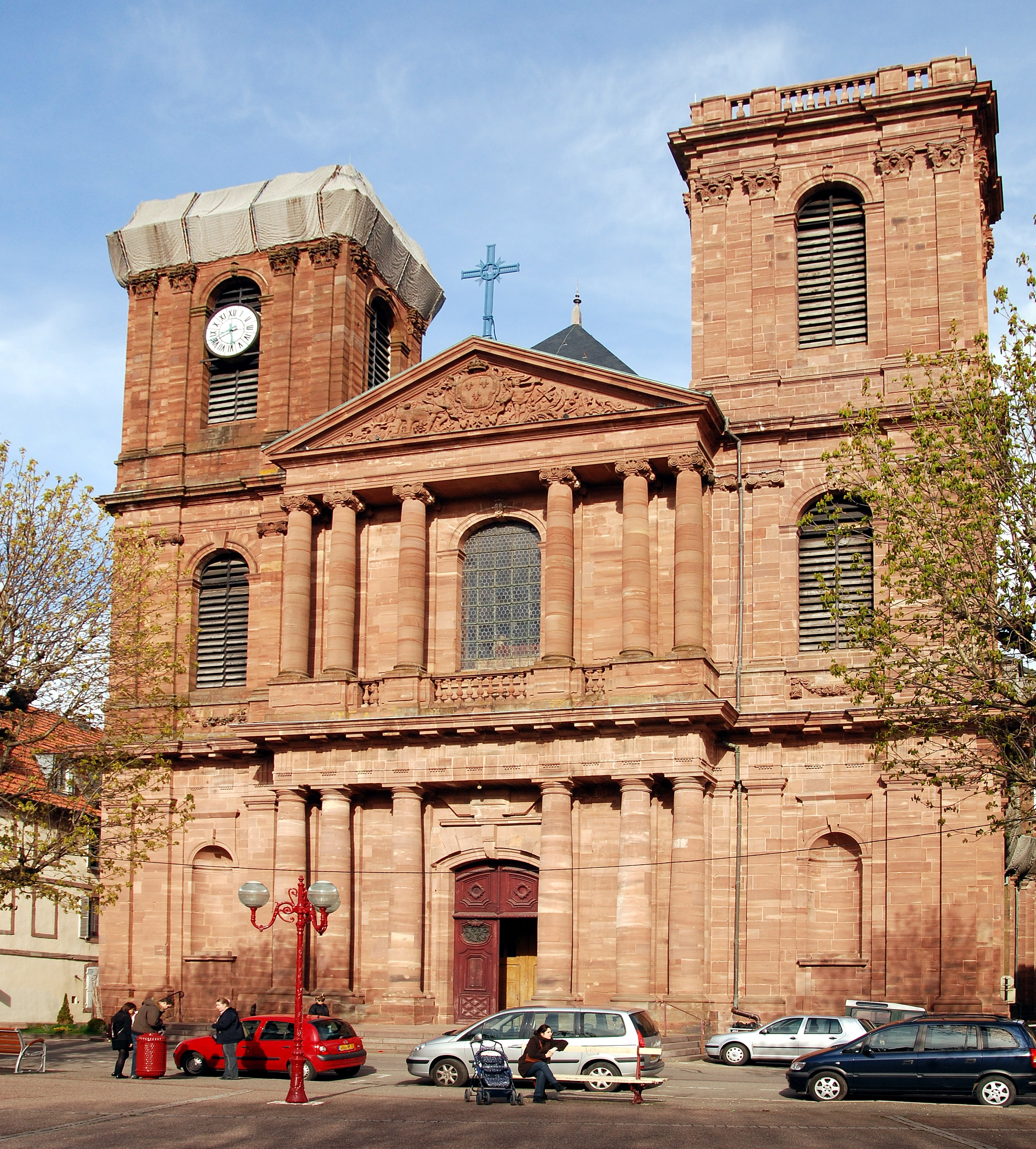
- Belfort Cathedral

Religion
- Affiliation: Roman Catholic Church
- Province: Diocese of Belfort-Montbéliard
- Rite: Roman
- Ecclesiastical or organisational status: Cathedral
- Status: Active

Location
- Location: Belfort, France
- Interactive map of Belfort Cathedral; Cathédrale Saint-Christophe de Belfort

Architecture
- Type: church
- Groundbreaking: 18th century

Belfort Cathedral, otherwise the Cathedral of Saint Christopher of Belfort (French: Cathédrale Saint-Christophe de Belfort), is a Roman Catholic church located in Belfort, Territoire de Belfort, France. The cathedral has been a national monument since 1930. It was declared a minor basilica on 9 May 1952.

The building that is now the cathedral was built as a church between 1727 and 1750 by the businessman Henri Schuller (or Shuler) (whose son was later a canon here) to plans by Jacques Philippe Mareschal, king's engineer at Strasbourg. It was built of red sandstone excavated from the quarry at Offemont, three kilometres from Belfort.

Although the church opened for worship in 1750, the north tower was not completed until 1845.

It contains an organ by the organ-builder Joseph Valtrin, installed in 1752 and now classed as an historic monument in its own right.

On 3 November 1979 the Diocese of Belfort–Montbéliard was created from part of the territory of the Archdiocese of Besançon. The seat of the bishop was established at Belfort, and St. Christopher's Church was elevated to the status of cathedral.
