= Rosalie Gower =

Rosalie Alma Gower (née Cheeseman; October 5, 1931 – October 13, 2013) was a Canadian nurse who became a city councilor in Vernon, British Columbia, and later a commissioner of the Canadian Radio-television and Telecommunications Commission (CRTC), known for her work in advancing women's rights.

== Early life and family ==
Daughter of Catherine (née) Bowman and George Cheeseman, an immigrant from England who became a physician working for the Canadian Pacific Railway, Rosalie Alma Cheeseman was born in Calgary, Alberta in 1931. She was raised in Field, British Columbia, with her older sister, Catherine "Iris". Her strong sense of independence was part of her parents' decision to send her to a private boarding school, Queen Margaret's School in Duncan, British Columbia.

From age 19, she dated architecture student Terry Gower in Victoria and married him in 1954. She completed a certificate in nursing, and then moved with her husband to San Francisco where he had found work. After travelling to various locations, they settled in Vernon, British Columbia. They had a son in 1958, a daughter in 1960, and two more sons in 1962 and 1965. She worked nights as a nurse, but there was tension in her marriage due to her husband's expectations that she be a housewife. She kept her finances separate from his.

== Politics and civil service ==
Gower obtained a seat on Vernon city council in 1972. She caught the attention of the local member of federal Parliament, who recommended her to the CRTC where she became first a part-time commissioner, and then, in 1980, a full-time commissioner based in Ottawa. At first, due to a fear of flying, she travelled around the country to hearings by train, but this allowed her the time to read the lengthy documents necessary for the decisions about such issues as granting broadcast licenses, cable television rights, and Canadian content regulations. She was steadfast in her position that public interest ought to come before telecommunications industry profits. She became known for her effective advocacy for improved media portrayals of women.

== Personal life ==
Although her husband, who had then retired, moved with her to Ottawa in 1980, their marriage did not survive the transition, and he returned to British Columbia after one year and filed for a legal separation. She retired in 1992 and returned to Vernon, where she took up organic gardening. She then overcame her fear of flying and traveled internationally. She spend long periods in San Miguel de Allende, Mexico, becoming involved in charity fundraising and also rediscovering her interest in community theatre. After being diagnosed with breast cancer, she remained in B.C. but continued to be active in charitable causes. She died on October 13, 2013, aged 82, following a stroke. She was survived by her four children.
