= Christine Jackson =

Christine Jackson, 1942–2013.

Christine Jackson (c. 1942 – 11 October 2013), was an English campaigner for human rights.

== Biography ==
Jackson was born in 1942 in Birmingham, West Midlands and had two sisters and three brothers. She was educated at Kings Norton Girls' Grammar School. In 1961, she married Peter Jackson, who she had met at a political demonstration in London.

As a young married couple, her husband was awarded a scholarship to study a PhD at the University of Hull whilst Jackson attended the University of Sheffield, graduating with a degree in politics and economics. As a student she was a volunteer for the National Council for Civil Liberties (NCCL), now known as Liberty. After graduating, she worked at the Cobden Trust and in the 1970s, she worked at the University of Manchester.

Jackson later became the Chairperson of the NCCL, chaired an NHS Health Trust, was on the Board of Sheffield Theatres and was a member of the Bar Council's Disciplinary Committee. When Liberty moved offices in 2011, she was invited open the new building Liberty House in Westminster and a plaque was placed there in her honour.

In 2011, she debated on behalf of the pro-euthanasia organisation Dignity in Dying, with Reverend Michael Nazir-Ali on BBC Radio 4’s Today programme. She also conducted humanist funerals.

She died of breast cancer on 11 October 2013, aged 71.

The Liberty Human Rights Christine Jackson Human Young Person Award is awarded annually in her memory. Winners have included Meltem Avcil and Helawit Hailemariam.
