= David Schwebel =

American psychologist

- Born: Columbus, Ohio, USA
- Spouse: Yikun
- Children: 2

Academic background
- Education: BA, Psychology, Yale University; M.A., Clinical Psychology, PhD, Clinical Psychology, 2000, University of Iowa
- Thesis: Relations between children's temperament, ability estimation, and unintentional injuries (2000)

Academic work
- Institutions: University of Alabama at Birmingham
- Main interests: Child Injury Prevention

David Charles Schwebel is an American psychologist.

== Early life and education ==
Schwebel was raised in Columbus, Ohio, where he attended two independent schools, Columbus Academy and The Wellington School. He completed his Bachelor of Arts degree at Yale University before enrolling at the University of Iowa for his Master's degree and PhD in clinical psychology. In 1999, Schwebel received a Woodrow Wilson Fellowship in Children's Health.

== Career ==
Upon completing his formal education, Schwebel accepted a faculty position at the University of Alabama at Birmingham (UAB). Throughout his tenure at UAB, he developed and implemented injury prevention techniques for pedestrian safety training in virtual reality environments, school playground safety via behavioral strategies targeting teachers, and drowning prevention through lifeguard training at public swimming pools. In 2011, he received a Fulbright Specialist award to work with Chinese scholars to reduce child-mortality rates caused by changing demographics there. He used this award to fund his research into dog bite prevention in rural China and in the United States, and kerosene safety in low-income South Africa neighborhoods.

In 2019, Schwebel was awarded the Distinguished Professional Contributions to Applied Research by the American Psychological Association as a psychologist whose research has "led to important discoveries or developments in the field of applied psychology." During the COVID-19 pandemic, Schwebel received a Centers for Disease Control and Prevention (CDC) grant to develop and evaluate an interactive website, called ShootSafe, to teach children how to engage safely with firearms to reduce the risk of accidental injuries and deaths from guns.

== Personal life ==
Schwebel and his wife Yikun have two children together.
