= Jan van de Ven =

Dutch politician

Jan van de Ven (18 September 1925 in Venlo – 29 October 2013) was a Dutch politician. He was a member of the House of Representatives from 1976 to 1981.
