= Charles A. Sorber =

- Born: September 12, 1939; Kingston, Pennsylvania, U.S.
- Died: October 18, 2013 (aged 74); New York, New York, U.S.
- Education: Pennsylvania State University; University of Texas at Austin
- Known for: Environmental engineering Wastewater; President UT Permian Basin; Interim president UT Arlington; Interim president UT Pan-American
- Honors: Fellow American Society of Civil Engineers; Outstanding Engineering Alumnus; The Pennsylvania State University; Distinguished Graduate of the College of Engineering; The University of Texas at Austin

Charles A. Sorber (September 12, 1939 – October 18, 2013) was an American civil engineer, engineering professor, and academic administrator He was born in 1939 in Kingston, Pennsylvania, US. He received a bachelor's of science degree in civil engineering in 1961 and a master's of science degree in civil engineering in 1966 at Pennsylvania State University, and a Ph.D. degree in environmental engineering in 1971 at the University of Texas at Austin. During his lifetime Dr. Sorber served in the U.S. Army and in a number of academic, research, and administrative positions in the United States.

== Career ==
Charles Sorber began his professional career with the U.S. Army, serving with the U.S. Army Environmental Hygiene Agency (U.S. Army Public Health Command) and with the U.S. Army Medical Research and Development Command (United States Army Medical Command) in a number of positions in Europe, from 1996 to 1975.

In 1975 he joined the University of Texas System serving in a number of academic, research, and administrative positions at the University of Texas at San Antonio, and as associate dean, College of Engineering of the University of Texas at Austin, a position he held from 1980 to 1986. He was appointed dean of engineering at the University of Pittsburgh in 1986 but returned to the University of Texas System in 1992, when he was appointed as the fourth president of the University of Texas of the Permian Basin where he served from 1992 until 2001. After stepping down as president at UTPB, he remained with the University of Texas System offices, involved in various aspects of developing relationships between the System and Sandia National Laboratories and Los Alamos National Laboratory.

In 2003 was appointed interim president of the University of Texas at Arlington a position he held for most of 2003 and early in 2004.

In 2007-08, the University of Texas at Austin asked him to serve as special assistant to the vice president of Student Affairs in reorganizing the Office of Student Financial Aid. In 2009-10, the UT System called on him again, to relocate to the Rio Grande Valley to serve as interim president of the University of Texas-Pan American.

== Contributions and honors ==
Professor Sorber authored or co-authored more than 130 papers and reports in the areas of land application of wastewater and sludge, water and wastewater reuse, water and wastewater disinfection, and higher education.

A member of several honorary societies, he received a number of awards for his teaching and professional service, including the Gordon Maskew Fair Award (1993) of the American Academy of Environmental Engineers and in 2005 the Orchard Medal (WEF Presidential Recognition Award) of the Water Environment Federation. Charles Sorber served as president of the Water Environmental Federation during 1992-93. In 1991 he was selected as a fellow in the American Society of Civil Engineers. In 1994 he was named Outstanding Engineering Alumnus of the Pennsylvania State University and in 2003 elected to the Academy of Distinguished Alumni, Department of Civil, Architectural and Environmental Engineering, Cockrell School of Engineering, the University of Texas at Austin.

Charles Arthur "Chuck" Sorber died suddenly in New York City on Friday, October 18, 2013, at the age of 74. On February 6, 2014, the University of Texas System Board of Regents approved the posthumous appointment of Charles A. Sorber, Ph.D., as president emeritus of UT Permian Basin.
