= Ryōzō Nagashima =

Japanese writer (1936–2013)

Ryōzō Nagashima (長島 良三, Nagashima Ryōzō, 1936 – October 14, 2013) was a Japanese editor, writer, and translator.

A graduate of Meiji University's French Literature Department, he joined Hayakawa Shobō, a publishing company, where he stayed until 1975 specializing in translating French literature, translating, among others, works by André Maurois, Boris Vian, Georges Simenon, Maurice Leblanc. In 1985, he published Dorafuto Renzoku Satsujin Jiken (ドラフト連続殺人事件, lit. The Draft Serial Murders). He also used the pseudonym Ryōzō Kitamura (北村良三, Kitamura Ryōzō).

He died on October 14, 2013, of heart failure.
