= Philippos Syrigos =

Greek journalist

Philippos Syrigos (Greek: Φίλιππος Συρίγος; 1948 – 13 October 2013) was a Greek investigative journalist and sports reporter who investigated doping cases in Greece. He was assaulted by masked men on 18 October 2004 in Athens but recovered. He was born in 1948 in the Akadimia Platonos neighbourhood of Athens.

== Career and Attack ==
Syrigos worked for a Greek daily newspaper Eleftherotypia. During the 2004 Olympics, he reported on the doping scandal of Kostas Kenteris and Katerina Thanou. He later claimed that he was aware of the alleged accident two hours before it happened. He has also written about hooliganism, the Paranga scandal, debts incurred by some of the Greek football clubs and other dealings connected to 2004 Olympics in Athens.

On 18 October 2004, when Syrigos was leaving the studios of radio Sport FM in Kallithea, Athens, three men attacked him, stabbed him and hit him with iron bars. Syrigos was rushed to hospital where he was operated and released for home care on 23 October. His attackers have never been traced.

== Death ==
Syrigos died of cancer in Athens on 13 October 2013, at age 65.
