= Vallachira Madhavan =

Kerala novelist (born 1934)

Vallachira Madhavan (17 May 1934 – 20 October 2013) was a Malayalam novelist and short story writer from Vallachira in Thrissur District of Kerala state of India.
