= Elena Volkova (painter) =

Russian painter

- Born: Elena Andreevna Volkova; June 3, 1915; Chuguyev, Russian Empire
- Died: October 8, 2013 (aged 98); Moscow, Russia
- Known for: Art
- Movement: Naïve art

Elena Andreevna Volkova (Russian: Елена Андреевна Волкова; 3 June 1915 – 8 October 2013) was a Russian painter, born in Chuguyev.

== Biography ==
Elena Volkova was born in 1915 in the Russian Empire, Kharkov Governorate, Chuguyev (birthplace of Ilya Repin) from a modest family; her father was a swimming coach and her mother a peasant.

In 1934 Volkova began to work as assistant-projectionist for a mobile cinema. During the war she was affected in an hospital; her husband died during the war. Without any artistic training, she began to paint at the beginning of the 1960s at the age of 45. She was quickly noticed by Vasyl Yermylov Kharkiv, founder of the Ukrainian avant-garde, who bought a number of her paintings. She was then noticed by Michael Alpatov, a famous Moscow art critic.

Sergei Tarabarov of the Gallery of Naive Art "Dar" (National Center for Contemporary Art of Moscow (NCCA)), said in 2000 that Elena Volkova was one of the most interesting naïve artist in Russia. Volkova lived in Moscow.

== Work ==
Her naïve paintings convey a message of nature, joy and simplicity, depicting animals, fruits, flowers, festive tables and nudes, as offerings to the ancient gods.

== Exhibitions ==
- 1973 Omsk, first solo exhibition
- 1990 Permanent collection of Gallery of Naïve Art (National Center for Contemporary Art of Moscow (NCCA))
- 2001 Moscow Museum of Modern Art, Exhibition " Peace to everybody! "
- 2005 Tretyakov Gallery of Moscow, Retrospective
