= Volgograd State University =

Russian academic institution

Coordinates: 48°38′31″N 44°25′21″E

- Coat of arms of the Volgograd State University
- Motto: Ab voce ad rem (Russian: От слова к делу)
- Type: Public
- Established: 1980
- Rector: Alla Kalinina
- Students: 14,000
- Location: 100 University Prospect, Volgograd, Russia, 4000062 (Russian: 400062, Волгоград, пр-т Университетский, 100), Volgograd, Russia
- Campus: urban
- Website: volsu.ru

University rankings

Regional – Overall
- QS Emerging Europe and Central Asia: 241-250 (2022)

Volgograd State University (VolSU, Russian: Волгоградский государственный университет) is a public university and one of the leading institutions of higher education in Volgograd, Russia.

== History ==
The first year enrollment (250 people) was made in 1980 and offered only 5 majors: Mathematics, Physics, History, Philology, and Linguistics at the Faculty of Sciences and Humanities. Today, the structure of the university includes Volzhsky Humanitarian Institute and five campuses in the cities of Volgograd Region: Kalach-na-Donu, Uryupinsk, Mikhaylovka, Frolovo and Akhtubinsk (Astrakhan Oblast).

== Academics ==
VolSU has 48 faculties and research centers, 22 four-year bachelor (Russian: бакалавр) degrees, 11 two-year master's (Russian: магистр) degrees, 42 Candidate of Sciences (Kandidat Nauk, equals PhD) postgraduate degrees, and 9 Doctors of Sciences (Doktor Nauk, equals Habilitation) degrees.

The university is attended by more than 14 thousand students and postgraduates. Established partnerships with the Moscow State University, St. Petersburg State University, University of Cologne, University of Sorbonne, InHolland University (Netherlands) and other higher educational institutions of Russia, Europe and America.

== Faculties and departments ==
- History, International Relations and Social Technologies
  - Department of Archeology and Foreign History
  - Department of History of Russia
  - Department of International Relations, Area Studies and Political Science
  - Department of Sociology
  - Department of Psychology
  - Department of Political Science
  - Department of Social Work and Pedagogics
- Mathematics and Information Technology
  - Department of Mathematical Analysis and Function Theory
  - Department of Fundamental Informatics and optimal control
  - Department of Computer Science and Experimental Mathematics
  - Department of Information Systems and Computer Modeling
  - Department of Laser Physics
  - Department of Radiophysics
  - Department of Theoretical Physics and Wave Processes
- Priority Technologies
  - Department of Forensic and physical material
  - Department of Telecommunication Systems
  - Department of Information Security
- Philology and Intercultural Communication
  - Department of Literature, publishing and literary
  - Department of Russian Language
  - Department of Journalism
  - Department of Linguistics and bond of Document
  - Department of English Philology
  - Department of Professional foreign language communication
  - Department of Romance Philology
  - Department of German Philology
  - Department of Theory and Practice of Translation
- Economy and Finance
  - Department of Corporate Finance and Banking
  - Department of Theory of finance, credit and taxation
  - Department of Global and Regional Economics
  - Department of Accounting, Analysis and Audit
  - Department of Economic Theory and Economic Policy
- Office and the Regional Economy
  - Department of Marketing
  - Department of Mathematical Methods and Computer Science in Economics
  - Department of Management
  - Department of State and Municipal Management
  - Department of Economic Informatics and Management
- Law
  - Department of Civil Law and Procedure
  - Department of Theory of State and Law
  - Department of Criminal Law
  - Chair of the criminal process and criminology
  - Department of International Law and Human Rights
  - Department of Philosophy
- Natural Sciences
  - Department of Biology
  - Department of Ecology and Nature Resources Management
  - Department of Geography and Cartography
- Continuing Education
- Department of Physical Education and Health Technologies

== Ranking ==
In 2015 VolSU was ranked among the best 150 schools of developing Europe and Central Asia according to Quacquarelli Symonds . In 2015 VolSU was ranked among top-20 best schools of Russia in the category "economics and management".

== See also ==
- Russian educational system
- Volgograd
