= Milton Schwebel =

American psychologist

- Born: May 11, 1914; Troy, New York
- Died: October 3, 2013 (aged 99); Tucson, Arizona
- Education: Columbia University
- Known for: Work in peace psychology
- Spouse: Bernice Schwebel
- Scientific career
- Fields: Psychology
- Institutions: New York University; Rutgers Graduate School of Education
- Thesis: The Interests of Pharmacists (1951)

Milton Schwebel (May 11, 1914 – October 3, 2013) was an American psychologist known for his pioneering work in peace psychology. This included research on the psychological effects of fear of nuclear war. He was a faculty member at the School of Education at New York University for eighteen years, where his positions included professor and department chair. He later taught at Rutgers University, where he served as dean of the Graduate School of Education for ten years. He was a founder of the American Psychological Association (APA)'s Division 48, the Society for the Study of Peace, Conflict, and Violence, and the founding editor-in-chief its official journal, Peace and Conflict: Journal of Peace Psychology. He was also the founding chair of the APA's Advisory Committee on Impaired Psychologists.
