= Superslow process =

Concept in Applied sciences

Superslow processes are processes in which values change so little that their capture is very difficult because of their smallness in comparison with the measurement error.

== Applications ==
Most of the time, the superslow processes lie beyond the scope of investigation due to the reason of their superslowness. Multiple gaps can be easily detected in biology, astronomy, physics, mechanics, economics, linguistics, ecology, gerontology, etc.

- Biology: Traditional scientific research in this area was focused on the describing some brain reactions.
- Mathematics: In mathematics, when the fluid flows through thin and long tubes it forms stagnation zones where the flow becomes almost immobile. If the ratio of tube length to its diameter is large, then the potential function and stream function are almost invariable on very extended areas. The situation seems uninteresting, but if we remember that these minor changes occur in the extra-long intervals, we see here a series of first-class tasks that require the development of special mathematical methods.
- Mathematics: Apriori information regarding the stagnation zones contributes to optimization of the computational process by replacing the unknown functions with the corresponding constants in such zones. Sometimes this makes it possible to significantly reduce the amount of computation, for example in approximate calculation of conformal mappings of strongly elongated rectangles.
- Economic Geography: The obtained results are particularly useful for applications in economic geography. In a case where the function describes the intensity of commodity trade, a theorem about its stagnation zones gives us (under appropriate restrictions on the selected model) geometric dimensions estimates of the stagnation zone of the world-economy (for more information about a stagnation zone of the world-economy, see Fernand Braudel, Les Jeux de L'echange).
- For example, if the subarc of a domain boundary has zero transparency, and the flow of the gradient vector field of the function through the rest of the boundary is small enough, then the domain for such function is its stagnation zone.
- Stagnation zones theorems are closely related to pre-Liouville's theorems about evaluation of solutions fluctuation, which direct consequences are the different versions of the classic Liouville theorem about conversion of the entire doubly periodic function into the identical constant.
- Identification of what parameters impact the sizes of stagnation zones opens up opportunities for practical recommendations on targeted changes in configuration (reduction or increase) of such zones.
