= Ronald Frankish =

Australian cricketer

Personal information
- Born: 6 October 1925; Perth, Western Australia
- Died: 17 October 2013 (aged 88); Perth, Western Australia
- Batting: Right-handed
- Bowling: Right arm Medium
- Source: ESPNcricinfo, 31 May 2016

Ronald Frankish (6 October 1925 – 17 October 2013) was an Australian cricketer. He played nineteen first-class matches for Western Australia between 1948 and 1953, ending with 799 first-class runs (including one century and two half-centuries), and 20 wickets.
