= Diocese of Belfort-Montbéliard =

Catholic diocese in France

Coordinates: 47°38′19″N 6°51′50″E

Diocese of Belfort–Montbéliard Dioecesis Belfortiensis–Montis Beligardi Diocèse de Belfort–Montbéliard

Catholic
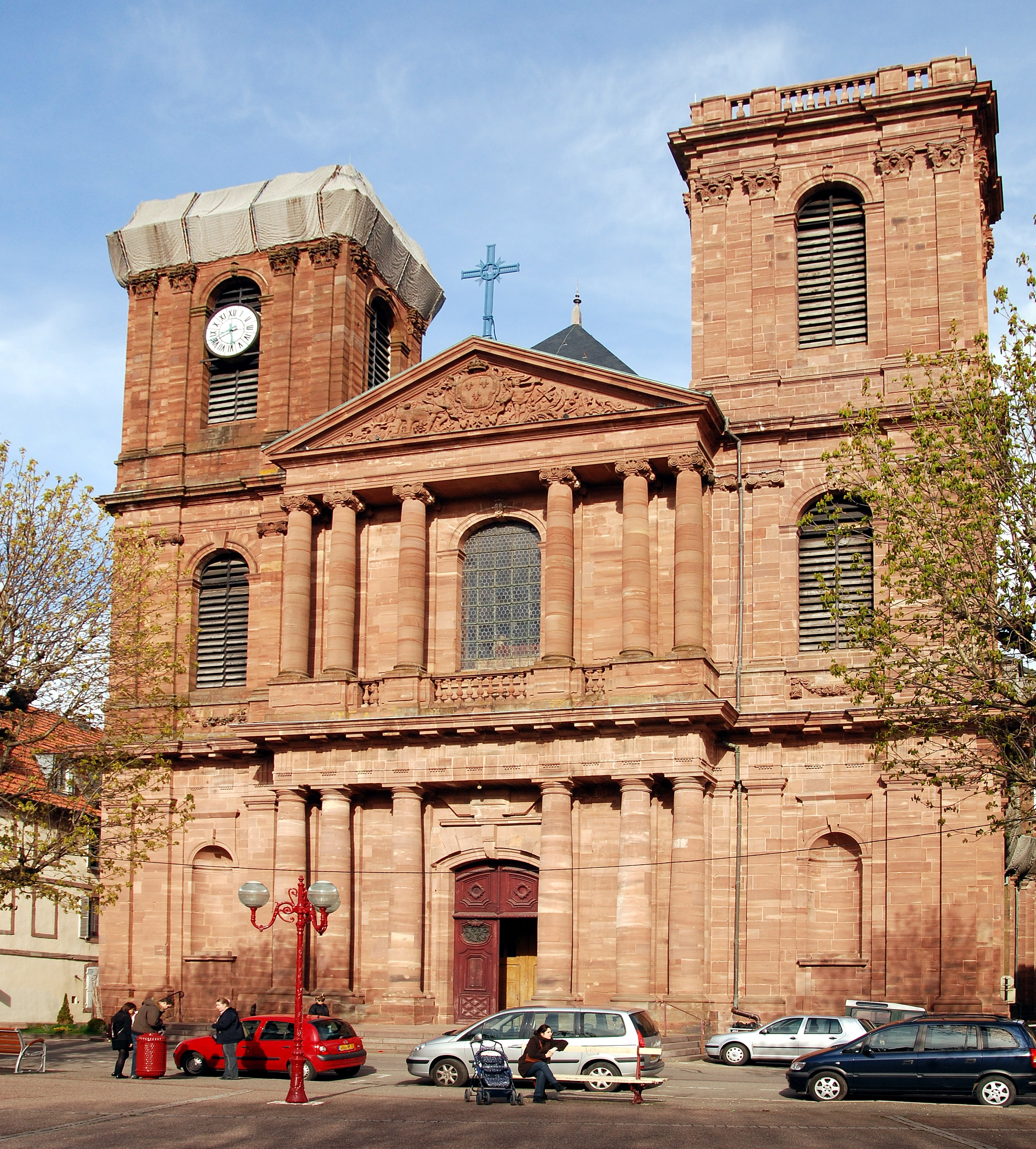
- Cathedral Basilica of St. Christopher

Location
- Country: France
- Ecclesiastical province: Besançon
- Metropolitan: Archdiocese of Besançon

Statistics
- Area: 1,472 km^{2} (568 sq mi)
- Population: Total; Catholics: (as of 2022); 318,000 (est.) ▼; 242,300 (est.) ▼ (76.2%)
- Parishes: 36

Information
- Denomination: Catholic Church
- Sui iuris church: Latin Church
- Rite: Roman Rite
- Established: 3 November 1979
- Cathedral: Cathedral Basilica of St. Christopher
- Patron saint: St. Paul
- Secular priests: 50 (Diocesan) ▼4 (Religious Orders) ▼14 Permanent Deacons ▼

Current leadership
- Pope: Leo XIV
- Bishop: Denis Jachiet
- Metropolitan Archbishop: Jean-Luc Bouilleret
- Bishops emeritus: Claude Pierre Charles Schockert

Map

Website
- Website of the Diocese

The Diocese of Belfort–Montbéliard (Latin: Dioecesis Belfortiensis–Montis Beligardi; French: Diocèse de Belfort–Montbéliard) is a Latin Church ecclesiastical territory or diocese of the Catholic Church in France. It is situated in northeastern France, and borders on Switzerland and Germany.

Erected in November 1979, the territory for a new diocese was removed from the jurisdiction of the Archdiocese of Besançon, and was constituted a suffragan diocese in its ecclesiastical province of Besançon.

== History ==
The diocese of Besançon, in the 1970s, had approximately 740,000 Catholics. A re-allocation of population was needed as the population grew in the post-WW II period. It was reduced by the transfer of c. 276,000 in the establishment of a new diocse.

The French Episcopal Conference had been made aware, by Archbishop Marc Lallier, of the unsatisfactory care of the people of his diocese. After this consultation, the archbishop petitioned the pope to divide the diocese and establish a new diocese. The pope consulted with the papal nuncio in France, Archbishop Egano Righi, who was fully informed of the particulars.

On 3 November 1979, Pope John Paul II issued an apostolic constitution (papal bull), "Qui Divino Consilio", removing from the diocese of Besançon the territory of Belfort; the "paus de Montbéliard" in the department of Doubs; and the arrondissement called "Héricourt" with the town of "Chalonvillars", to form the new diocese of Belfort-Montbéliard. The church of Saint Christopher in the city of Belfort was designated the new cathedral, and a Chapter of canons was authorized. The diocese of Belfort-Montbéliard was made a suffragan of the metropolitanate of Besançon

=== Cathedral ===
Originally just a parish church, Saint Christopher became a collegiate church on 24 May 1342, thanks to the generosity Catherine de Castenelborgen, Countess of Montbéliard and Dame de Belfort. The Chapter was composed of a Provost and five canons, one of whom was appointed priest of the parish. The parish priest was to be named by the Seigneur de Belfort.

On 9 May 1952, the cathedral of Saint Christopher was granted the honorary title of "minor basilica" by Pope Pius XII.

The diocese was placed under the patronage of Saint Paul and his Conversion.

The Lutheran Church in France was especially well-represented in the diocese. One of the two Lutheran synods was long established in Montbéliard.

=== Parishes ===
Following the decrees of the Second Vatican Council, a movement began in France to consolidate struggling parishes, due to the declining number of priests, and to the movements of people from country parishes to the cities. Much of the difficult and controversial work was carried out in diocesan synods. Ultimately, however, the responsibility fell to the bishop. Bishop Claude Schockert announced a plan to reduce 134 parishes to 34; the plan began to be implemented in 2000, and by 2013 there were 32 parishes and 4 "parish ensembles". In 2022, there were 36 "new parishes" in the diocese of Belfort-Montbéliard.

== Bishops ==
- Eugène Georges Joseph Lecrosnier (3 November 1979 – 1 March 2000)
- Claude Pierre Charles Schockert (1 March 2000 – 21 May 2015)
- Dominique Blanchet (21 May 2015 – 9 January 2021)
- Denis Jachiet (2 October 2021-)

== See also ==
- City of Belfort
- Roman Catholic Archdiocese of Besançon
- Catholic Church in France
