= Dick van den Polder =

Dutch footballer and journalist

Personal information
- Date of birth: 23 September 1934
- Place of birth: Rotterdam, Netherlands
- Date of death: 21 October 2013 (aged 79)
- Position: Midfielder

Senior career*
Years	Team	Apps	(Gls)
- Excelsior
- * Club domestic league appearances and goals

Dick van den Polder (23 September 1934 – 21 October 2013) was a Dutch footballer and journalist.

== Career ==
=== Football career ===
Van den Polder played for Excelsior between 1954 and 1964. He was one of the club's first professionals, and made a total of 199 appearances for them.

=== Journalism career ===
Van den Polder retired from football at the age of 29 to become a journalist, and wrote for a number of papers including Rotterdamse Parool, Vrije Volk, Rotterdams Dagblad and Radio Rijnmond.
