= Trees Huberts-Fokkelman =

Dutch politician

Trees Huberts-Fokkelman (18 February 1934, 's-Hertogenbosch – 31 October 2013, Tilburg) was a Dutch politician. She was a Member of the Senate from 1991 to 1995. She died in 2013 at the age of 79.
