= Piero Tiberi =

Italian actor and voice actor (1947–2013)

- Born: 16 January 1947; Rome, Italy
- Died: 25 October 2013 (aged 66); Rome, Italy
- Occupations: Actor; voice actor; dialogue writer; dubbing director
- Years active: 1955–2013
- Children: Alessandro Tiberi

Piero Tiberi (16 January 1947 – 25 October 2013) was an Italian actor and voice actor.

== Biography ==
Born in Rome, Tiberi began his career in 1955 acting in the film Bravissimo directed by Luigi Filippo D'Amico. He then acted in six other films during his lifetime but he was more known to the Italian public as a voice dubber. He was best known for voicing Slinky Dog in the Italian version of the Toy Story film series. Tiberi also dubbed Charles Martin Smith, Dan Aykroyd, Joe Pesci and Cheech Marin in some of their films.

He was the father of actor and voice actor Alessandro Tiberi.

== Death ==
Tiberi died on 25 October 2013, at the age of 66, after suffering a long illness.

== Filmography ==
=== Cinema ===
- Bravissimo (1955)
- Hannibal (1959)
- Execution Squad (1972)
- The Cynic, the Rat and the Fist (1977)
- From Corleone to Brooklyn (1979)
- Hot Potato (1979)
- Sound (1988)

== Dubbing roles ==
=== Animation ===
- Slinky Dog in Toy Story, Toy Story 2, Toy Story 3, Hawaiian Vacation, Small Fry
- Tetsuya Tsurugi and professor Tonda in Great Mazinger
- Roscoe in Oliver & Company
- Zalmie Belinsky in American Pop
- Sylvester the Cat in Daffy Duck's Quackbusters
- Rusty in Home on the Range
- Principal Skinner in The Simpsons (season 1)
- Andro Umeda in Tekkaman: The Space Knight
- Piccolo in Dragon Ball (Dynit edition)
- Ollie / Boes in Ox Tales

=== Live action ===
- Elwood Blues in The Blues Brothers, Blues Brothers 2000
- Beldar Conehead / Donald R. DeCicco in Coneheads
- Clifford Skridlow / Doctor Detroit in Doctor Detroit
- Mack Sennett in Chaplin
- John Burns in The Couch Trip
- Belini in Once Upon a Time in Mexico
- Victor Delgado in Underclassman
- Felix Gumm in Spy Kids, Spy Kids 2: The Island of Lost Dreams, Spy Kids 3-D: Game Over
- Eddie Cortez in Race to Witch Mountain
- Huggy Bear in Starsky & Hutch
- Terry "The Toad" Fields in American Graffiti, More American Graffiti
- Michael Gold in The Big Chill
- Bruce in Beyond Therapy
- Joey LaMotta in Raging Bull
- Gaff in Blade Runner
- Luis Fernandez in Escape to Victory
- Otis in Superman II
- Gus Gorman in Superman III
- Lothar Zogg in 3 Ninjas: High Noon at Mega Mountain
- John Watson in Without a Clue
- Federico Robles in Wild Rose
- Ed Lasky in Falling in Love
- Azro in Monkey Trouble
- Hog in Goin' South
- Roy Sweeney in Flesh and Bone
- Woody Allen in What's Up, Tiger Lily?
- Paul in Another Woman
- Frank White in King of New York
- Tony "Duke" Evers in Rocky III
- Hikaru Sulu in Star Trek: The Motion Picture
- Samuel Sutherland in The Game
- Chi Chi in Scarface
- Abraham "Doc" Johnson in Hamburger Hill
- Andy McGee in Firestarter
- Paul in Black Widow
- Joseph Späh in The Hindenburg
- Mac Eliot in Predator
- Frost in Men at Work
- Albert Crundall in Picnic at Hanging Rock
- Steven Arrocas in Internal Affairs
- Jefe in Three Amigos
- Pete in A Clockwork Orange
- John Kreese in The Karate Kid
- Tyree in Silverado
- Kazuo Fujita in King Kong vs. Godzilla
- Jack Goodman in An American Werewolf in London
- Private Drake in Aliens
- Waiter in Herbie Goes to Monte Carlo
- Hector Salas in The China Syndrome
- Farah Aden in Out of Africa
