= Shizuka Murayama =

Shizuka Murayama (村山密, Murayama Shizuka; October 26, 1918 - October 22, 2013) was a Japanese-French yōga painter.

Born in Ohara Village (present day Itako), Ibaraki Prefecture, Murayama started to study watercolor painting under Susumu Kobori. After moving to Tokyo, he enrolled at the private Kawabata Art Academy (川端画学校).

In the latter half of the 1950s, he moved to France, the citizenship of which he acquired in 1981.

== Awards ==
- Prix Charles de Gaulle (1962).
- Médaille d'honneur du travail (vermeil) and Honorary citizen of Paris (1991)
- Honorary citizen of Itako, Ibarako Prefecture, Japan (1991)
- Grande Medaille d'Or of the Académie des Beaux-Arts (1995)
- Special Award for People of Merit of Ibaraki Prefecture (1996)
- Chevalier (knight) of the Legion of Honour (1997)
