= Robert Mazer =

American sports executive (1923-2013)

- Born: Robert R. Mazer; August 11, 1923; Milwaukee, Wisconsin, U.S.
- Died: 18 October 2013 (aged 90); Chicago, Illinois, U.S
- Education: University of Wisconsin at Madison
- Occupation(s): Businessman, chemical engineer
- Known for: Owner of Chicago White Sox
- Spouse: Claire Mazer (m. 1957)
- Children: 4

Robert R. Mazer (August 11, 1923 - October 18, 2013) was an American chemical engineer, industrialist, philanthropist, and longtime principal owner of the Chicago White Sox. He was the founder and owner of Mazer Chemicals, Inc, a company specialized in the development and commercial production of emulsifiers and surfactants. After selling the company in 1985, Mazer purchased a considerable ownership stake in the Chicago White Sox, becoming the largest single shareholder and principal owner, although an investment group led by Jerry Reinsdorf held a controlling interest in the team.

Mazer and his wife were notable patrons of several American Jewish charitable and political organizations, gifting millions of dollars to groups including the Jewish United Fund, World ORT, and AIPAC.

== Life and career ==
Mazer was born in Milwaukee, Wisconsin to a Jewish family of Russian descent. He attended the University of Wisconsin at Madison and majored in chemical engineering. During World War II, he served in the Navy as an electrical technician at the Great Lakes Naval Center.

Mazer founded Mazer Chemicals, Inc, a company specialized in the commercial production of emulsifiers and surfactants used in the cosmetics, cleaning, food, and home care industries. Over time, he expanded the business considerably, turning it into a 250-employee company with offices in Canada, Mexico, and the United Kingdom. In 1985, he sold the company to PPG Industries for an undisclosed price. Mazer used the money from the sale to realize his lifelong dream of owning a professional baseball team. He purchased a considerable ownership interest in the Chicago White Sox in 1988 and became the largest shareholder with a permanent seat on the team's board of directors. After retiring from chemical engineering, Mazer shifted his focus towards philanthropy and political outreach.
