= Kōichi Iijima =

Japanese linguist, novelist and poet

- Born: February 25, 1930; Okayama City
- Died: October 14, 2013 (aged 83); Tokyo
- Education: Tokyo University
- Occupations: writer, university professor
- Children: Yōichi Iijima
- Writing career
- Language: Japanese
- Period: 1953-2013
- Literary movement: surrealism, modernism

Kōichi Iijima (飯島耕一, Iijima Kōichi; February 25, 1930- October 14, 2013) was a Japanese poet, novelist, and translator. He was a member of the Japan Art Academy.

== Biography ==
Born in Okayama City, Iijima graduated from the French Literature Department of Tokyo University. While in university he established together with, among others, Isamu Kurita the magazine Cahier. In 1956, he and Makoto Ōoka were among the founders of the Surrealism Research Society.

In 1953, he published his first collection of poems, Tanin no sora ("Another person's sky"). In 2008, he was elected a member of the Japan Art Academy. He also worked as a professor at Meiji University and Kokugakuin University. He translated or wrote about Henri Barbusse, Antonin Artaud, Brassaï, Joan Miró i Ferrà, Henry Miller, Marcel Aymé, Guillaume Apollinaire, etc.

He died on October 14, 2013, at a Tokyo hospital of malabsorption syndrome.

== Personal life ==
He is the father of architecture critic Yōichi Iijima.

== Awards ==
- Takami Jun Award for ゴヤのファースト・ネームは (Goya no first name wa) (1974)
- Tōson kinen rekitei Award for 飯島耕一詩集 (Iijima Kōichi shishũ) (1978)
- Gendai shijin Award for 夜を夢想する小太陽の独言 (Yoru wo musōsuru shotaiyō no dokugen) (1983)
- Bunkamura Prix des Deux Magots for 暗殺百美人 (Ansatsu hyaku bijin) (1996)
- Yomiuri Prize for アメリカ (America) (2005)
- Nihon gendai ishika bungakukan Award (2005)
