= Suleiman Arabiyat =

Jordanian academic and politician

Suleiman Muflih Arabiyat

Agriculture Minister
- In office 1989–1990

Personal details
- Born: 1938 Salt, Transjordan
- Died: 23 October 2013 (aged 74–75)

Suleiman Arabiyat (1938 – 23 October 2013) was a Jordanian academic, politician and writer. He served as agriculture minister between 1989 and 1990.

== Career ==
Arabiyat was born in Salt in 1938. He became a professor of agriculture economics and researcher at the University of Jordan during the early 1970s and joined the then new agriculture faculty. He served as dean of the same faculty in 1989. He furthermore served as president of Al-Balqa` Applied University and Mutah University. During his life he also assumed various positions at the ministry of agriculture and he was agriculture minister between 1989 and 1990. He died on 23 October 2013.
