= Julian Bennett (politician) =

American politician

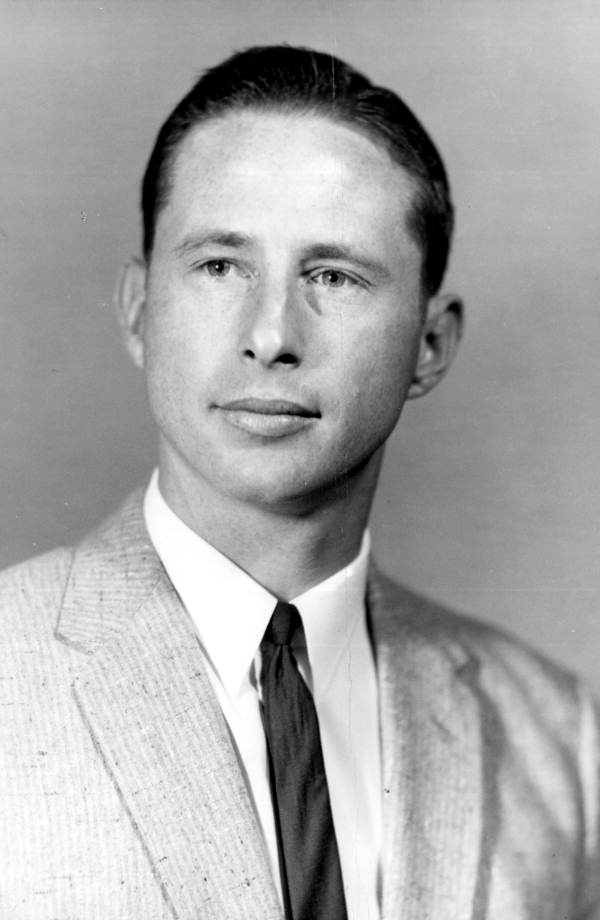
Julian Bennett, 1961

Julian Bennett (May 3, 1929 – October 27, 2013) was a Democratic politician and a member of the Florida House of Representatives for Bay County (1961–1966). He was born in Panama City, Florida.

He was a Presbyterian. In 1951, he received an LLB from Stetson University. He served in the Infantry of the United States Army from 1951 - 1952. From 1952 to 1954, he served as a lieutenant in the Judge Advocate Generals office. He was elected to the Florida House in 1960. On October 27, 2013, he died in Panama City at the age of 84.

== Sources ==
- Morris, Allen, compiler. The Florida Handbook 1963-1964. pg 149. Peninsula Publishing. Tallahassee. 1963.
