= Malawi–Taiwan relations =

- Malawi: Taiwan

Malawi–Taiwan relations refer to foreign relations between Malawi and Taiwan. Diplomatic relations existed from 1966 to 2008. There are no current official diplomatic relations between the two countries.

== Switching relations to People's Republic of China ==
In December 2007, Taiwan sent officials to Malawi and summoned its ambassador to save diplomatic relations amid reports China was aggressively courting Malawi. The Malawi ambassador to Taiwan Thengo Maloya reassured Minister of Foreign Affairs James C. F. Huang that his country had no intention of switching diplomatic recognition from Taiwan to the People's Republic of China. In 2008, Malawi decided to establish diplomatic ties with China instead.

The Malawi Government said that it recognised that there is but one China in the world" and that "Taiwan in an inalienable part of China's territory".

=== Taiwanese reaction ===
In response, the Taiwanese Government said that "In order to safeguard Taiwan's national dignity, we hereby announce the Taiwan government will immediately cease all diplomatic ties with the government of Malawi". The Taiwanese Ministry of Foreign Affairs said the decision of Malawi was the "greatest insult to the people of Taiwan". The Taiwanese Government announced the immediate cessation of all Taiwan sponsored humanitarian aid and projects

The Taiwanese Government accused the Chinese government of luring the Malawians with $6 billion in aid and other inducements.
