= Harbhajan Singh Rissam =

Indian cardiologist and writer

- Born: 10 August 1951; Jammu, Jammu and Kashmir, India
- Died: 17 October 2013 (aged 62); Jammu, India
- Resting place: Shastri Nagar Cremation Ground, Jammu, J&K; 32°41′22″N 74°51′11″E
- Occupations: Interventional cardiologist Writer
- Known for: Cardiology; Medi-fiction
- Spouse: Balbir Kaur Rissam
- Parent: Ranjeet Kaur
- Awards: Padma Shri

Harbhajan Singh Rissam (10 August 1951 – 17 October 2013) was an Indian interventional cardiologist, philanthropist and writer, known for his medical service and his novel based on medical profession. He was the director of cardiac clinical services at Max Healthcare, Delhi and his maiden novel, The Scalpel - Game Beneath, the first book of a proposed trilogy published in 2010, is a medical thriller on the medicine mafia. The Government of India awarded him the fourth highest civilian honour of the Padma Shri, in 2006, for his contributions to medical science.

== Biography ==
Harbhajan Singh Rissam, born in 1951 in Jammu in a Kashmiri Sikh family, in the northern state of Jammu and Kashmir, did his early schooling at Central Basic School, Jammu after which he graduated in science from Government Gandhi Memorial Science College. When his family fled from Poonch, he moved with them to Punjab and secured his medical degree from Government Medical College, Amritsar with gold medal before completing his MD in cardiology at Postgraduate Institute of Medical Education and Research, Chandigarh. Starting his career at the Government Gandhi Memorial Science College and after a stint in Saudi Arabia, he returned to India to join Apollo Hospital, Delhi as an interventional cardiologist but, later, moved to Max Healthcare, Delhi as the director of cardiac clinical services. In between, he was also associated with Sher-i-Kashmir Institute of Medical Sciences, Sri Nagar, Fortis Healthcare and Batra Hospital, New Delhi. He published over 100 medical papers in various national and international journals and presented papers at medical conferences including the conference on Conquering Heart Disease in the Himalayan Region of the Cardiac Society of Nepal, held in November 2010. He served as a member of the board of governors of the Medical Council of India, the apex body for medical education in India. He was appointed as a member of Medical Council of India Board of Governors on 14 May 2011 after its reconstitution by Union Health Ministry. He was also a member of the Asia Pacific Vascular Society and the Cardiological Society of India.

Rissam, who had a penchant for writing, published his first short story, Moscow Street, when he was thirteen. In 2006, he took a long break from work and stayed in Paris for three months where he wrote a novel and in 2010, he published it under the title The Scalpel - Game Beneath, which was a medical thriller on the mafia activities associated with medical tourism and organ trade. The novel, considered by many as an attempt at whistle-blowing, was reported to be the first insider account by a practising doctor in India and the first medical thriller by an Indian author. He planned two more novels based on happenings at a medical institute, to complete a trilogy of medical thrillers, but they were never published. The Government of India awarded him the civilian honor of the Padma Shri in 2006.

Rissam was married to Balbir Kaur, a medical doctor, and the couple had a son, Harbir Singh Rissam and a daughter, Harmeet Kaur. He is survived by his mother Ranjeet Kaur, Brother Jujhar Singh Rissam, Nephews Satwant Singh Rissam & Sandeep Singh Rissam. His younger nephew Sandeep Singh Rissam is an Engineer by qualification & was working with him in his philanthropy and social works like organizing Blood Donation awareness and other projects . He died on 17 October 2013, succumbing to an infection for which he had been hospitalized at Max Healthcare, Delhi. He was cremated at a cremation ground in Shastri Nagar, Jammu, the next day.

== See also ==
- Medical tourism
- Robin Cook (American novelist)
