= Ray Melikian =

Ray Melikian

Ray Melikian (June 7, 1918 – October 25, 2013) was a fighter pilot of the United States Army Air Forces during World War II where he achieved the rank of major. Melikian flew 228 missions during the war and was known for having "superkeen" eyesight.

== Life ==
Of Armenian descent, Ray Melikian was born in Fresno, California in 1918. He attended school at Kerman High School. He joined the military where he completed his training in August 1941. After completion of his training, Melikian was sent to Australia then New Guinea. He is a farmer by profession.

== World War II ==
When World War II commenced, Ray Melikian was assigned to the 7th Fighter Squadron of the United States Army Air Forces. Melikian was assigned to fly many aircraft including Curtiss P-40 Warhawk. The aircraft would eventually have three markings of victory.

On August 23, 1942 Melikian took off from Darwin, Australia on a mission to intercept Japanese aircraft and eventually shot down a Japanese Mitsubishi A6M Zero.

On March 5, 1943, while flying over the skies of New Guinea, Melikian managed to shoot down a Ki-43 Oscar over Malahang in the Morobe Province.

Melikian allowed a friend to borrow his plane in order to conduct a mission. The plane was never returned.

In 1969 the wreckage of the plane was discovered in a jungle in New Guinea with skeletal remains in it. The plane still contained Melikian's signature on the side of it.

In his career as an Air Forces pilot, Melikian went on 228 missions and shot down a total of three Japanese fighter aircraft.

== Medals ==
His decorations include:

Army Air Forces Pilot Badge

Silver Star with two bronze oak leaf clusters
Distinguished Flying Cross with two bronze oak leaf clusters
Air Medal with two bronze oak leaf clusters
Army Good Conduct Medal
American Defense Service Medal with one bronze service star
American Campaign Medal
Asiatic-Pacific Campaign Medal with two bronze campaign stars
World War II Victory Medal

== Awards ==
In 1942 Ray Melikian was named Fresno's most outstanding man of the year.

== Legacy ==
Ray Melikian's plane was found in a junkyard in Australia in 1974. The plane was badly damaged and was in many parts.

The plane was sold twice until it was purchased off eBay and then restored by Chris Prevost, owner of Vintage Aircraft Co., who bought and machined many of the parts needed for its restoration. The parts needed for restoration cost approximately $600,000 which included a fuselage that cost $151,000. In 2009 the aircraft was completed and on March 14, 2009, Ray Melikian flew the plane with Chris Provost at the Vintage Airport in Sonoma, CA. Ray Melikian was 90 years old at the time of the flight. The restored aircraft included Melikian's name and victories on the left side of the cockpit.

A portion of one of the Curtiss P-40 Warhawk aircraft Ray Melikian flew during World War II is also displayed at the Museum of Charters Towers.
