= Edmund Niziurski =

Polish writer (1925–2013)

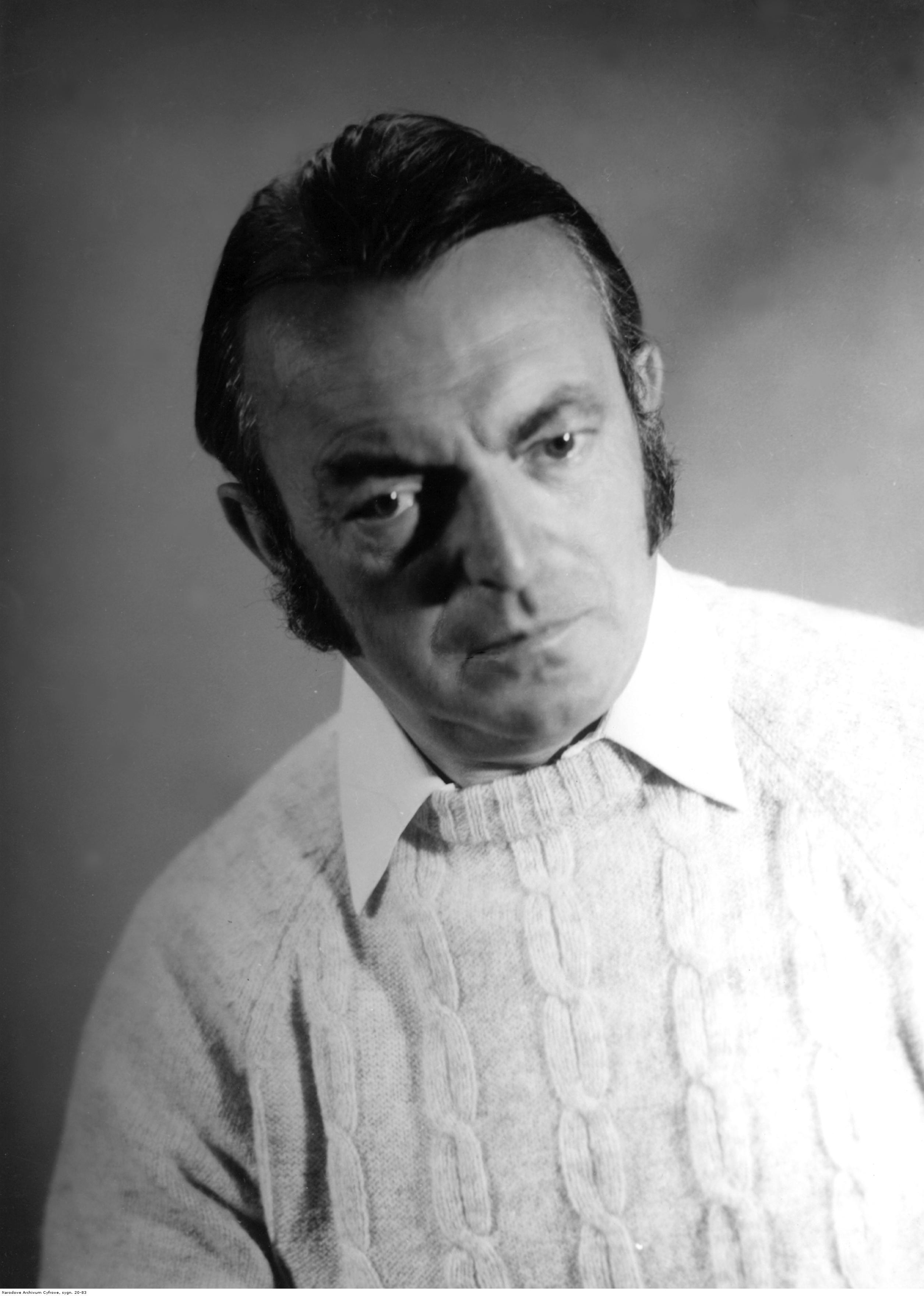
- Born: 10 July 1925; Kielce, Poland
- Died: 9 October 2013 (aged 88); Warsaw, Poland
- Occupation: Writer
- Spouse: Zofia Kowalska (m. 1947)

Edmund Niziurski (July 10, 1925 – October 9, 2013) was a popular Polish writer, author of numerous humorous novels and stories for children, recipient of the Order of the Smile.

== Early life ==
Niziurski was born into a middle-class family in Kielce, Poland to father, Stanisław, a civil servant and mother Leokadia. He was the oldest of three siblings. He attended middle school in Kielce, but had to interrupt his education because of the German and Soviet attack on Poland. In September 1939, he was evacuated to Hungary together with his family where he taught French at a Polish refugee camp.

He returned to Poland in 1940 and spent the rest of the war in the village of Jeleniec, near Ostrowiec working in the Huta Ludwików factory. He attended an illegal high school, where he graduated in 1943 and started studying law in Jeleniec.

After the end of the war, he continued his legal studies at Lublin Catholic University and Jagiellonian University. He studied journalism at the Higher School of Social Sciences in Krakow in the years 1946-1947 and sociology at the Jagiellonian University in 1947. In 1947 he completed his legal studies and obtained a master's degree, and in the same year married Zofia Barbara Kowalska.

== Career ==
He taught history in an adult middle school in Kielce, but quit after a year due to the low pay. The experience of being a teacher informed the stories he wrote about students. He made his debut as a poet in 1944 in Biuletyn Informacyjny, a magazine issued by the Home Army. Although a large part of his work was written for an adult audience, he quickly realized that he had a special contact with young readers. He started working with children's magazines such as Płomyczek and Świat Młodych. He also worked with Polish Radio, for which he wrote radio plays.

He lived in Kielce, then in Katowice and finally, in 1952, moved to Warsaw. He worked as a journalist for Wiez weekly, at the same time writing his own books. Niziurski was a member of the Association of Polish Writers (Stowarzyszenie Pisarzy Polskich).

In the course of the time, his books for children and adolescents have become very popular, while the novels written for adult readers are much less well-known. In 1975 he was awarded the Order of the Smile and in 2008 received the Medal for Merit to Culture - Gloria Artis.

Niziurski wrote dynamic, witty and humorous stories mostly revolving around the everyday school life of his teenage characters, but also containing elements of sensation and, in his later works, science-fiction. When writing stories about 13 or 14 year olds, he gave them the mentality of slightly older boys, an intellectual surplus, as he believed that the reader should aspire to their level. In this way, he tried to educate his reader in a very discreet way.

Niziurski died in 2013, aged 88, in Warsaw.

== Bibliography ==
- Księga urwisów (The Book of the Brats), Iskry, Warsaw, 1954
- Siódme wtajemniczenie (The Seventh Initiation),
- Sposób na Alcybiadesa (A remedy for Alcibiades), Iskry, Warsaw 1964, also a 1998 movie Spona at IMDb
- Niewiarygodne przygody Marka Piegusa (Unbelievable Adventures of Marek Piegus)
