= Eugène Georges Joseph Lecrosnier =

His Excellency Eugène Georges Joseph Lecrosnier
- Bishop of Belfort-Montbéliard
- Church: Roman Catholic Church
- See: Roman Catholic Diocese of Belfort-Montbéliard
- In office: 1979–2000
- Predecessor: none
- Successor: Claude Pierre Charles Schockert
- Previous post: Prelate

Orders
- Ordination: 20 December 1947

Personal details
- Born: 20 April 1923 Maupertuis, Manche, France
- Died: 15 October 2013 (aged 90) Coutances, Manche, France

Eugène Georges Joseph Lecrosnier (20 April 1923 − 15 October 2013) was a French Prelate of the Catholic Church.

Lecrosnier was born in Maupertuis, France, and was ordained a priest on 20 December 1947. He was appointed auxiliary bishop of the Archdiocese of Chambéry, as well as titular bishop of San Leone, on 21 April 1969 and ordained bishop on 21 June 1969. Lecrosnier was appointed to the Diocese of Belfort-Montbéliard on 5 November 1979 and served as bishop until his retirement on 1 March 2000.
