= Toshio Udō =

Japanese writer and literary critic

Toshio Udō (右遠 俊郎, Udō Toshio, September 1, 1926 - October 11, 2013) was a Japanese writer and literary critic.

Born in Okayama Prefecture, he spent his youth in Dalian. After the Second World War he studied at Tokyo University, graduating from the Japanese Language and Literature Department. He published novels and literary reviews in magazines such as Shin Nihon Bungaku. In 1959 he was one of the nominees for the Akutagawa Prize with 無傷の論理 ("Mukizu no ronri"). No prize was awarded that year. Later he joined what is now called the Japanese Democratic Writers' Association (called Bunkadōmei, the "Literary Alliance" at the time). In 1989 he was awarded the Yuriko Takiji Award for Shōsetsu Asahi Shigeru ("Asahi Shigeru, the Novel").

He died on October 11, 2013, in Tokyo from pneumonia.

== Books ==
- 無傷の論理 東邦出版社 1969
- 病犬と月 東邦出版社 1970
- 野にさけぶ秋 東邦出版社 1972
- さえてるやつら 新日本出版社 1972 のち映画化
- 不逞の春 東邦出版社 1974
- わが笛よ悲しみを吹け 東邦出版社 1975
- 恋愛入門 東邦出版社 1975
- 文学・真実・人間 光和堂 1977.5
- 長い髪の少年たち 東邦出版社 1977.9
- 青春論ノート 青木書店 1979.10
- 冬の大いなる虹 新日本出版社 1980.4
- 読書論ノート 青木書店 1980.11
- 思いだすこと忘れえぬひと 対話/古在由重 同時代社 1981.8
- 安中騒動記 光和堂 1981.9
- 碁の心人の心 大月書店 1983.8
- こどもの目おとなの目 児童文学を読む 青木書店 1984.5
- 赤いシクラメン 新日本出版社 1986.5
- 小説朝日茂 新日本出版社 1988.12
- 忘れ得ぬ人 新日本出版社 1990.1
- 風青き思惟の峠に 新日本出版社 1991.2
- 冬の日はほのか 新日本出版社 1994.2
- 海を渡った蝶 新日本出版社 1997.4
- 右遠俊郎短篇小説全集 本の泉社 1999.1
- 明治の碁 本因坊秀栄の生涯 本の泉社 2002.11
- 桜橋 本の泉社 2003.1
- アカシアの街に 新日本出版社 2005.5
- 国木田独歩の短篇と生涯 私家版 2007.7
- 小林多喜二私論 本の泉社 2008.2
- 詩人からの手紙 本の泉社 2009.6
