= Joop Langhorst =

Dutch footballer

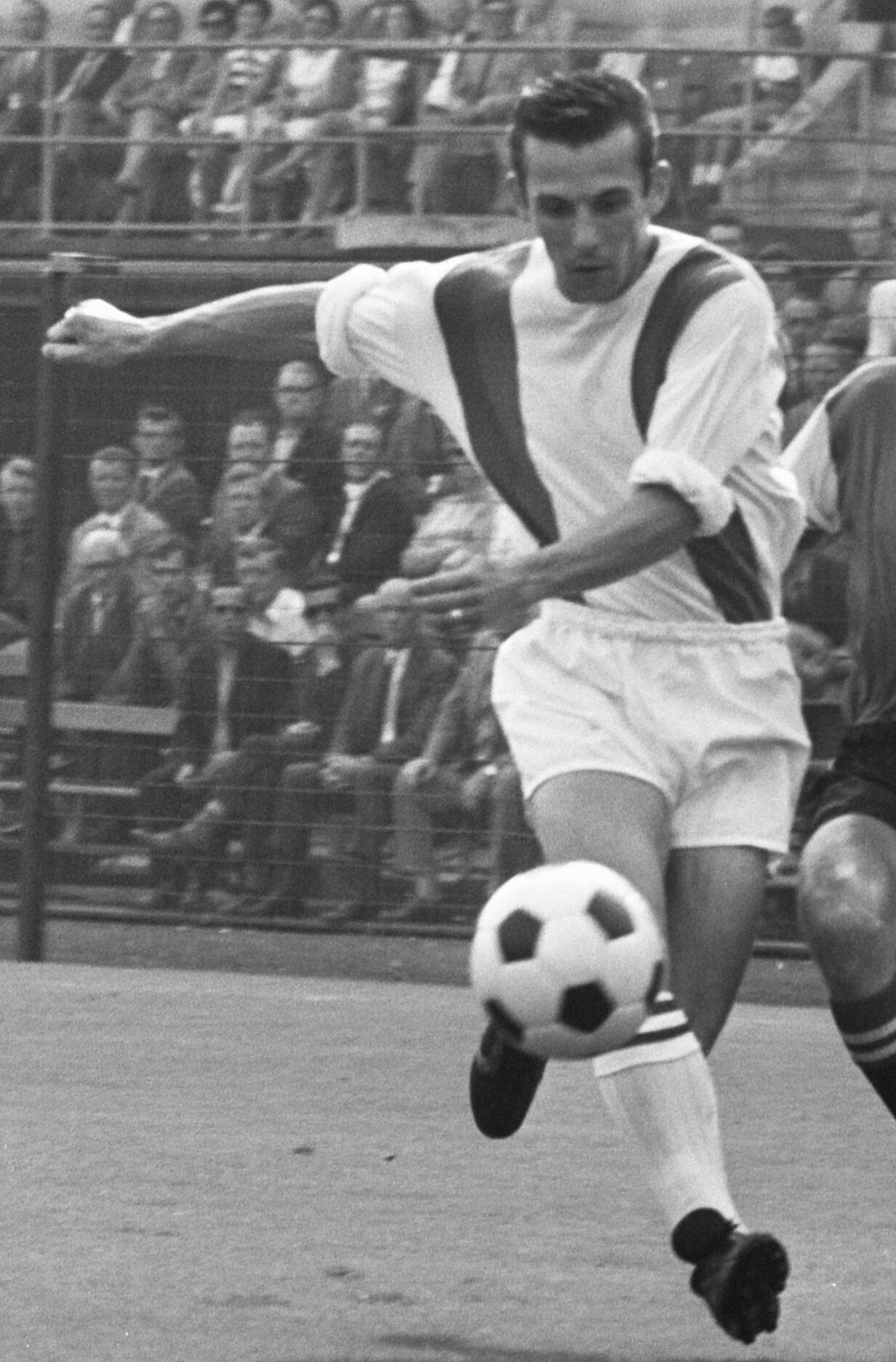
- Langhorst with S.V.V. in 1969

Personal information
- Full name: Johan Martinus Langhorst
- Date of birth: 21 June 1943
- Place of birth: Rotterdam, Netherlands
- Date of death: 9 October 2013 (aged 70)
- Place of death: Groningen, Netherlands
- Position: Rightback

Youth career
- 1954–1966: Sparta Rotterdam

Senior career*
Years	Team	Apps	(Gls)
1966–1969	Sparta Rotterdam	68	(0)
1969–1970	S.V.V.	34	(0)
- * Club domestic league appearances and goals

Johan Martinus "Joop" Langhorst (21 June 1943 – 9 October 2013) was a Dutch professional association football player who played as a right back defender.

== Club career ==
Born in Rotterdam, Netherlands, Langhorst debuted with Sparta Rotterdam on 18 December 1966 against Sittardia. He played 68 games in three seasons. In his first season, the club won the KNVB Cup, defeating ADO Den Haag 1–0. In 1969, he signed with S.V.V., where, in his debut season, the team won the Eerste Divisie (First Division) and the championship. Langhorst retired the following season.

== Death ==
Langhorst moved from Rotterdam to Sneek and died in Groningen at age 70 on 9 October 2013.
