= Rutgers Graduate School of Education =

Professional school in New Brunswick, New Jersey, US

Coordinates: 40.501454°N 74.447032°W

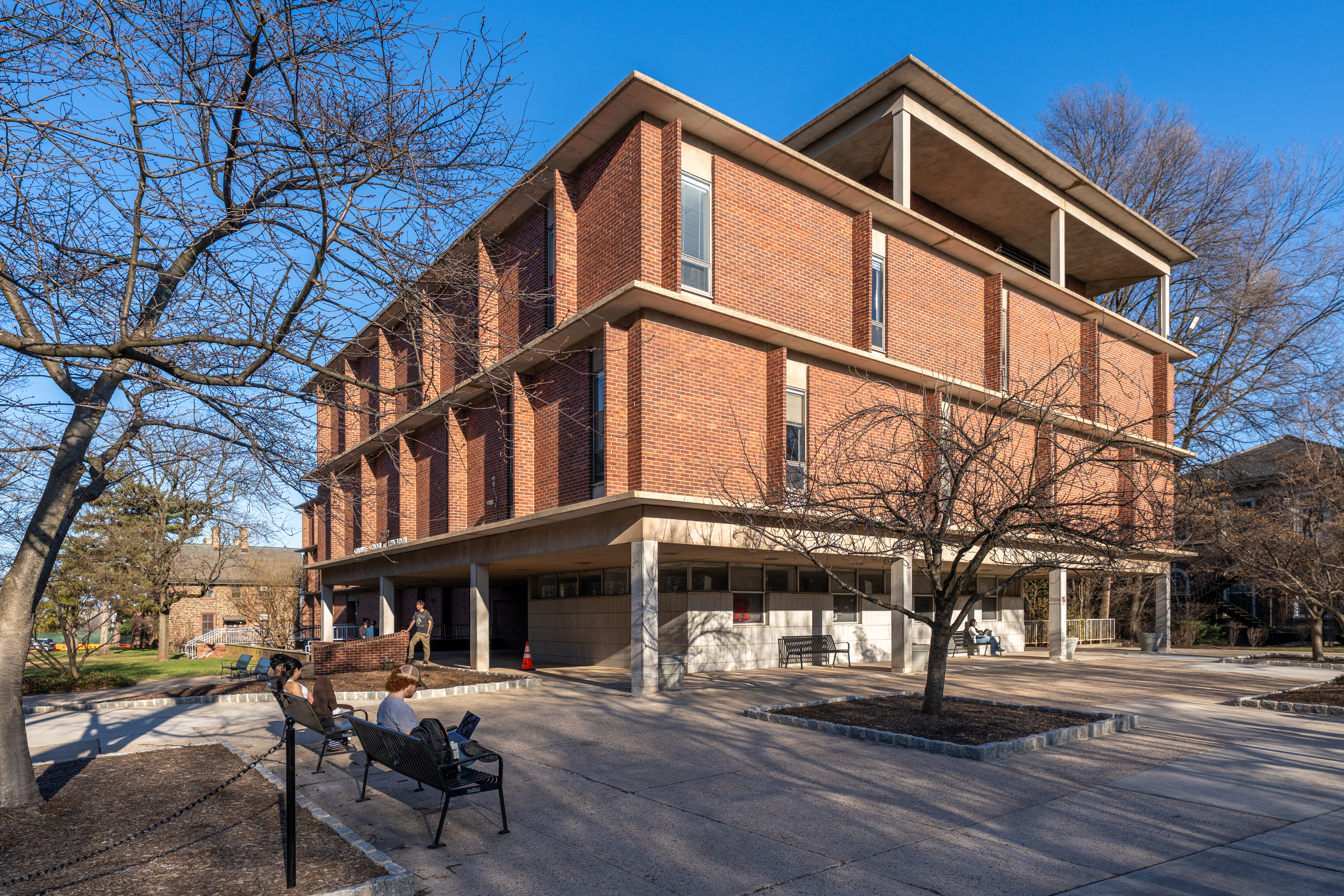
The building housing the Graduate School of Education

The Graduate School of Education is a degree-granting graduate-level professional school on the New Brunswick campus of Rutgers, The State University of New Jersey. Established in 1923, the school offers programs for Master of Education (Ed.M.), Doctor of Education (Ed.D.) and Doctor of Philosophy (Ph.D.) degrees. As of 2013, U.S. News & World Report ranks Rutgers graduate-level education programmes 47th in the country, and ninth in the Northeastern United States.
