= Vladimir Eljanov =

Ukrainian chess player (1951–2013)

Personal information
- Born: Владимир Эльянов; 8 May 1951 Kharkiv, Soviet Union
- Died: 19 October 2013 (aged 62)

Chess career
- Country: Ukraine
- Title: International Master (1999)
- Peak rating: 2472 (January 1999)

Vladimir Eljanov (8 May 1951 – 19 October 2013) was a Ukrainian chess International Master, Merited Coach of Ukraine, FIDE Senior Trainer (2013) and chess book publisher.

== Family ==
His son is grandmaster Pavel Eljanov.
