= Michael Locke (biologist) =

English-born Canadian biologist

Michael Locke (February 14, 1929 in Nottingham, U.K – October 20, 2013 in London, Ontario) was an English-born Canadian biologist. He was Chair of Zoology at Western University from 1971 to 1985 and a Fellow of the Royal Society of Canada.
