= Eunice Kazembe =

Malawian politician (1952–2013)

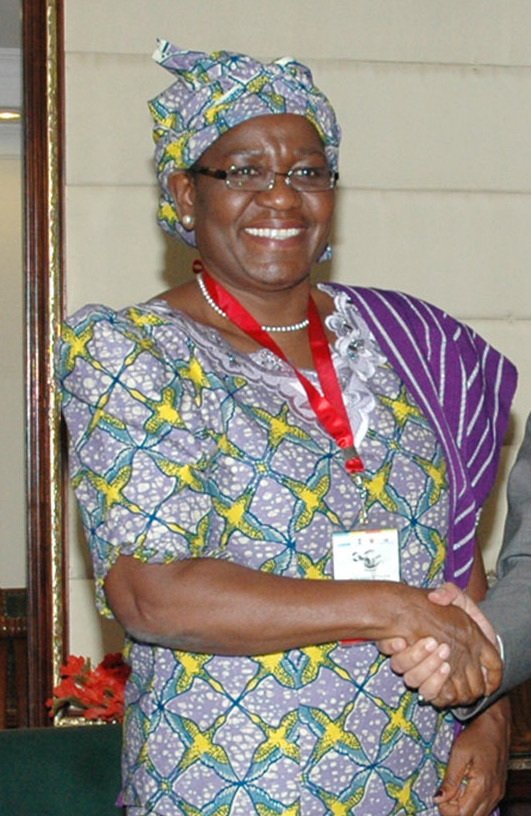
- Eunice Kazembe in New Delhi on March 15, 2010

Minister of Industry and Trade
- In office 15 June 2009 – 26 April 2012

Minister of Education
- In office 26 April 2012 – 28 October 2013

Personal details
- Born: 1952
- Died: 2013 (aged 60–61)

Eunice Kazembe (1952 – 28 October 2013) was a Malawian politician who was appointed Minister of Industry and Trade in the cabinet of Malawi in 2009. On 26 April 2012 President Joyce Banda named her new cabinet and Kazembe became the minister of Education.

== Life ==
Kazembe was born in 1952. She obtained a Bachelor of Commerce degree from Carleton University, Ottawa, and a Masters in Business Administration from Indiana University. She was General Manager of the Agricultural Development and Marketing Corporation (Malawi), and Malawi's Ambassador to the Republic of China (Taiwan). Kazembe was a Chief Advisor to the President on Urban Development from 2005 to 2009, and served as Minister of Trade and Industry, and Minister of Mines, Energy and Natural Resources. She is a trustee and co-founder of Chisomo Children’s Club.

Kazembe was elected a Member of Parliament for Chiradzulu South in May 2009, running on the Democratic Progressive Party (DPP) platform. She was appointed Minister of Industry and Trade in the cabinet that became effective on 15 June 2009. She retained this position in the cabinet announced on 9 August 2010.
