= Georg Weinhold =

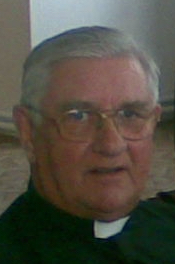
Georg Weinhold

Georg Weinhold (28 November 1934 − 10 October 2013) was a German Roman Catholic bishop.

Weinhold was born on 28 November 1934 in Zittau, Germany.

Ordained to the priesthood in 1959, Weinhold was named titular bishop of Idicra and auxiliary bishop of the Diocese of Dresden-Meissen in 1973. He resigned in 2008.

Weinhold died on 10 October 2013, aged 78, in Dresden.
