= Gottfried Fischer =

German psychologist (1944–2013)

Gottfried Fischer (13 September 1944 – 2 October 2013) was a German psychologist, psychotherapist and psychoanalyst. He is considered to be the founder of psychotraumatology in Germany and has been director of the Institute for Clinical Psychology and Psychological Diagnostics at the University of Cologne from 1995 to 2009.

== Life ==
Fischer studied psychology and philosophy. He received a doctor's degree in psychology and qualified as a professor in medical psychology at the University of Freiburg with a thesis on qualitative psychology research with the title: ”Contradiction and change – a dialectic model of change in the psychoanalytical process. A contribution to research on psychoanalytical processes in the framework of a qualitative single case study.”

Fischer supervised the research at the German Institute for Psychotraumatology, which was founded in 1991. He also taught therapy and supervised the German and the European Academy for Psychotraumatology. He managed the Institute for Research in Psychotherapy, Development of Methods and Professional Training for psychological Psychotherapists in depth psychological and analytical Psychotherapy at the University of Cologne. Fischer founded the German Society for the Science of Psychotherapy (DGPTW) and was managerial editor of the magazine for Psychotraumatology, the Science of Psychotherapy and psychological Medicine (ZPPM) and continued to treat patients in his own private psychotherapeutic practice.

== Work ==
Since 1995 Fischer has been managing the Cologne Help for Victims Project (KOM-Project). In the autumn of 1998 the state parliament of North Rhine-Westphalia decided that the project would be implemented countrywide. As a part of the project the Center for Psychotraumatology was established in the Alexianer Hospital Krefeld in the summer of 2004 as the teaching and research department of the IKPPD.

Fischer developed a method of etiology orientated treatment of psychical disorders, the Psychodynamic-dialectic Psychotherapy (PdP). This method incorporates elements of behavioral therapy with a psychodynamically guided conception of cases and shaping of relationships. The Multidimensional Psychodynamic Trauma Therapy (MPTT) is used for the psychotraumatic etiology. By using this method on average 10 therapy sessions are sufficient to treat people successfully, who are at risk of suffering from long-term traumatic disorders.

In cooperation with German companies and institutions Fischer managed preventative procedures for victims of misfortunes. He developed a concept for recuperation weeks for traumatized people and helpers after stressful assignments as well as a training program for risk and personnel management in crisis situations for executives.

Fischer also developed a documentation and planning system for Psychotherapy and the Treatment of Traumas (KÖDOPS). Further fields of teaching in the psychology degree course next to clinical psychology are work-, business and organizational psychology with a focus on the area of clinical institutions, psychotherapy research as well as art psychology and everyday esthetics.

== Publications ==
Fischer has published about 200 works, including 10 monographs and publisher's compilations.

- Fischer, G. & Riedesser, P.: Lehrbuch der Psychotraumatologie. 4. überarb. Aufl., UTB Ernst Reinhardt, München, 2009
- Logik der Psychotherapie. Philosophische Grundlagen der Psychotherapiewissenschaft. Asanger, Kröning, 2008
- Kausale Psychotherapie. Ätiologieorientierte Behandlung psychotraumatischer und neurotischer Störungen. Asanger, Kröning, 2007
- Von den Dichtern lernen ... Kunstpsychologie und dialektische Psychoanalyse. Königshausen & Neumann, Würzburg, 2005
- Konflikt, Paradox und Widerspruch. Ausstieg aus dem Labyrinth - für eine dialektische Psychoanalyse. Asanger, Kröning, 2004
- Neue Wege aus dem Trauma. Patmos, Düsseldorf, 2003

In English:

- Fischer, G. (1995). Methodological Issues in Psychotraumatology - Qualitative and Quantitative Strategies of Research. In: Stiftung für Kinder (Ed.), Children - War and Persecution (pp. 49–52). Osnabrück: secolo Verlag.
