= Adam Curle =

British academic (1916–2006)

- Born: Charles Thomas William Curle; 4 July 1916; L'Isle-Adam, Val-d'Oise, France
- Died: 28 September 2006 (aged 90); London, England
- Spouses: Pamela Hobson (m. 1939, divorced) Anne Edie (m. 1958)
- Parent(s): Richard Curle and Cordelia Curle
- Awards: Gandhi International Peace Award (2006)

Academic background
- Education: Charterhouse School; New College, Oxford; Exeter College, Oxford
- Influences: Paulo Freire, George Gurdjieff, P. D. Ouspensky, Buddhist philosophy (especially Tibetan Buddhism and Vajrayana), Sufism, Quaker thought

Academic work
- Discipline: Social psychology, pedagogy, development studies, peace studies
- Institutions: Tavistock Institute of Human Relations; University of Oxford; University of Exeter; University of Ghana; Harvard University; University of Bradford
- Notable works: Educational Strategy for Developing Societies (1963), Making Peace (1971)
- Influenced: John Paul Lederach

Charles Thomas William Curle (4 July 1916 – 28 September 2006), better known as Adam Curle, was a British academic, known for his work in social psychology, pedagogy, development studies and peace studies. After holding posts at the University of Oxford, University of Exeter, University of Ghana and Harvard University, in 1973 he became the inaugural Professor of Peace Studies at the University of Bradford, following the establishment of the University's Department of Peace Studies. Curle's works included several books on education, including Educational Strategy for Developing Societies (1963), and a number of books on peace and peacemaking, including Making Peace (1971). He was also, throughout his career and after his retirement in 1978, active in peacemaking and mediation, and visited Nigeria and Biafra several times as part of a Quaker contingent during the Nigerian Civil War of 1967–70.

== Early life and education ==
Charles Thomas William Curle was born in L'Isle-Adam, Val-d'Oise, France, on 4 July 1916, as the Battle of the Somme raged nearby. His father was the British author, critic and journalist Richard Curle. His mother was Cordelia Curle (née Fisher), whose siblings included the historian H. A. L. Fisher, the cricketer and academic Charles Dennis Fisher, the naval officer William Wordsworth Fisher, the banker Edwin Fisher, and Adeline Vaughan Williams, the wife of the composer Ralph Vaughan Williams. Their other relatives included the historian Frederic William Maitland, the photographer Julia Margaret Cameron, the author Virginia Woolf and the painter Vanessa Bell. He was named after three of his mother's brothers, and took the name Adam, after his birthplace, after returning to France in 1919.

He grew up in Wheatfield, Oxfordshire, where he developed an affection for animals and a sensitivity to landscape. Richard Curle was not a frequent presence in his son's childhood; Adam did not meet his father until he was three years old. Curle later described how they became closer in Richard's later life, however, "on a man-to-man basis," having "somehow missed the father–son phase". Curle attributed his pacifism to the influence of his mother, who lost three of her brothers to war and instilled a hatred of war in her son. Woodhouse argued that Curle's mother was also responsible for the "self-confidence which was to enable him later to make a series of unconventional moves at critical turning points in his life". His "inclination to kick against convention", however, was identified by Woodhouse as closer to that of Richard Curle.

Curle attended Charterhouse School, where he was unhappy, later recalling having "survived a dreadful conventional schooling ... by playing the flute (mainly Bach), writing poems and reading the mystics". From 1935 he attended New College, Oxford, at first studying history with the intention of becoming a civil servant, then switching to anthropology. He continued his studies at Exeter College, Oxford and the Oxford Institute of Social Anthropology, and in 1938 travelled to Sápmi and the Sahara Desert on field trips.

== Career ==
=== Britain and Pakistan ===
Curle served in the British Army for six years during World War II, rising to the rank of Major and becoming a research officer in the Civil Resettlement Units (CRUs). In this role he was involved in the development of a residential rehabilitation programme which provided counselling, skills training, medical and recreational facilities, and opportunities for social contact, and was tasked with evaluating the effectiveness of the CRUs' work. In this period he developed an interest in psychology, in particular the integration of psychological and anthropological approaches to society, and the psychological effects of traumatic experiences. He received a postgraduate degree in anthropology in 1947, having drawn on his experiences with the CRUs in his work. He began his academic career with a series of journal articles also drawing on those experiences, the first of which was a paper in Human Relations on the experiences of prisoners of war in returning to their communities and the relationship between individual and community.

In 1947 Curle took up a position at the Tavistock Institute of Human Relations, where he researched rural decay in South West England. This work led to his appointment, in 1950, as a lecturer in social psychology at the University of Oxford. While at Oxford in the early 1950s he developed an interest in the connections between social psychology and education policy. While he remained interested in the social psychiatry approach that Tavistock Institute emphasised, he also came to believe in the necessity of education for individuals' psychological stability and positive relationships with others, and published several articles on education policy. His work at Oxford led to his appointment in 1952 to the Chair in Education and Psychology at the University of Exeter, where he remained until 1956.

While at Exeter he became involved in a project focused on development in Europe, and his work took on an international dimension. In 1956 he was invited, via Harvard University, to advise on education policy in Pakistan. Initially planning to stay in Pakistan for a year, he later decided to remain for two additional years, and resigned from his position at Exeter in order to do so. From 1956 to 1959 he was an advisor to the Pakistan Planning Board, in which capacity he travelled in Pakistan (including present-day Bangladesh), including in the Hindu Kush. In addition to education policy, his work in Pakistan concerned health care, housing, labour relations, welfare and the Federally Administered Tribal Areas, where he worked among the Pashtun and Kho peoples. He would later frequently refer to his experiences in Pakistan in his lectures and books.

=== Ghana and Harvard ===
In 1959 Curle was appointed Professor of Education at the University of Ghana. While in Ghana he became a Quaker, which, like his pacifism, he attributed to his mother's influence. He also travelled widely in Africa during this time, and advised the Ghanaian government on education and development. His inaugural lecture, entitled The Role of Education in Developing Societies, was published in 1961. He resigned from the university in 1961, having reached the conclusion that the institution, which was then predominantly white, was "out of place" in a political context marked by the growth of African nationalism. That year he travelled to South Africa with the intention of establishing a college for Black Africans, but was arrested.

Also in 1961 he was appointed director of Harvard University's Centre for Studies in Education and Development, a position he would hold until 1971. While at Harvard he participated in field projects in Barbados, Central America, Nigeria and Tunisia, and returned to Pakistan in 1963 and 1964 as a consultant on education, contributing to Pakistan's third five-year plan. The fieldwork he conducted at Harvard led him to see education policy as vital in achieving and maintaining peace. In 1964 he also became an advisor to the United Nations Relief and Works Agency for Palestine Refugees in the Near East.

=== Indo-Pakistani War ===
Curle visited India and Pakistan as part of a Quaker contingent in the wake of the Tashkent Declaration, the January 1966 agreement which ended the Indo-Pakistani War of 1965. The team's roles included gathering information, facilitating communication between the Indian and Pakistani sides, offering assessments of the situation, and proposing possible measures for achieving peace. Curle was selected for the role due to his knowledge and experience of Pakistan. His role involved presenting the case for conciliation to the younger people involved in the conflict and those sceptical of possibilities for peace. The Quakers played only a minor role in maintaining peace in India and Pakistan and did not facilitate a breakthrough in relations, but did help to maintain the less tense relations that had developed. Their report described the history of Quaker activity in the region, outlined Indian and Pakistani viewpoints, and described their own work, and concluded that the onus was on India to take conciliatory measures towards Pakistan.

=== Nigerian Civil War ===
Known by this time for his work in the fields of pedagogy and development studies, Curle was consulted by governments and charities, and provided mediation in the Nigerian Civil War of 1967–70 as part of a group of three Quakers alongside John Volkmar and Walter Martin. Prior to becoming a mediator in Nigeria Curle had been involved in establishing a model school in Ayetoro, Nigeria. On their initial trip in 1967, their intention was to listen to the parties in conflict and to aid them through conciliation or relief. Arriving before the war began, Curle, Martin and Volkmar met with C. Odumegwu Ojukwu, Hamzat Ahmadu and Okoi Arikpo, and remained hopeful that peace could be maintained; a week after the team left, however, Ojukwu declared the secession of the Republic of Biafra. In early 1968 Curle and Volkmar hosted initial informal talks and met with Yakubu Gowon.

In March 1967 Curle and Martin visited Biafra, where they met with Louis Mbanefo and again with Ojukwu and Gowon. When the Commonwealth Secretariat arranged for public talks to be held in Kampala, Uganda, in May, Curle and his wife Anne were selected to attend as a Quaker delegation. The Curles' role in the Kampala talks involved mediating between Commonwealth Secretary-General Arnold Smith and the Biafrans and proposing possible terms of settlement. In Making Peace Adam described his and Anne's role as involving "persuasion, clarification, message carrying, listening, defusing, honest brokering, encouraging, and liaison with the Commonwealth Secretariat". The Curles then returned to Nigeria, where Adam met again with Gowon. In August 1967 Curle and Volkmar attended the continuing negotiations in Addis Ababa, Ethiopia. When Gowon announced a "final push" against Biafra, the Quakers turned their attention to relief operations.

Curle, Volkmar and Martin embarked on another series of trips in September and October 1968. In the continuing impasse, the proposal made by Hamani Diori, the president of Niger, for a Quaker-sponsored meeting was taken up. Ojukwu's representatives expressed interest in Diori's proposal, and Curle discussed the proposal with Smith and a representative of the British government. The stalemate that continued through 1969, however, led the Quakers to once again turn their attention to providing relief. In October 1969, Curle met again with Gowon alongside Volkmar and Kale Williams. In London, Curle and Williams met with Smith and a Biafran representative to discuss issues including the possibility of the Commonwealth Secretariat again becoming involved in negotiations. In January 1970, however, the war ended with the Biafrans' surrender. Curle and Volkmar rejoined Williams on Nigeria days after the surrender, in order to observe the post-war climate and offer conciliation.

C. H. Mike Yarrow, in his study of Quaker reconciliation efforts, argues that the personal qualities and personalities of the Quaker contingent played a pivotal role in their success in building connections with Nigerian and Biafran leaders, though from mid-1968 Yarrow argues the Quaker organisation and the faith it engendered came to play a similar role. While Yarrow argues their listening process was a success, he describes their effectiveness at changing the parties' perceptions of one another in more ambivalent terms. In concluding, Yarrow argued that while the negotiated peace the Quakers sought was not achieved, Yarrow argues that "the peace terms resulting after the military solution were imbued with the spirit of conciliation."

Curle's experiences of the Indo–Pakistani and Nigerian conflicts contributed to his interest in the causes of war and informed his research on the relationships between violence, social transformation, and the goals of development. At Harvard he responded to the 1968 student protests and the emergence of the New Left by teaching history to schoolchildren in a working-class neighbourhood of Cambridge, Massachusetts, where he was struck by similarities to the "underdeveloped world".

=== Professor of Peace Studies ===
In 1973 Curle became the United Kingdom's first Professor of Peace Studies at the University of Bradford. Robert A. McKinlay, who was involved in the selection of the new Department of Peace Studies's inaugural professor, recalled contacting Curle after a fellow Quaker suggested Curle would disabuse him of the viability of the position, after which Curle expressed an interest in the post. As Professor of Peace Studies he was responsible for both the department's administration and its academic development. His first year at Bradford was spent recruiting staff, seeking especially those with experience in peacemaking, and developing a postgraduate programme. Among those he appointed were Tom Stonier, who would later head Bradford's School of Science and Society; Aleksandras Štromas, a lawyer and Soviet dissident; David Bleakley, a former Minister of Community Relations in the Government of Northern Ireland; Michael Harbottle, a former chief of staff of the United Nations Peacekeeping Force in Cyprus; Uri Davis, who had been involved in peacemaking among Jews and Arabs in the Middle East; Vithal Rajan, a Gandhian who had worked in India; Nigel Young, a political scientist formerly based at the University of Birmingham; and Tom Woodhouse, who became Curle's research assistant.

While at Bradford, Curle contributed to the development of peace studies and drew on his own experiences of mediation. In his 1975 inaugural lecture, entitled "The Scope and Dilemmas of Peace Studies", he argued for the necessity not only of resolving individual conflicts but also of addressing the underlying causes of war, which he identified as injustice and inequality. Departments of peace studies, he argued, should thus seek to create fair, just and open societies that would not foster the resentments that ultimately lead to war. Accordingly, he sought to operate his department in a democratic, participatory and non-hierarchical manner, and saw his own role as that of a co-ordinator rather than a leader.

=== Retirement ===
Towards the end of his tenure at Bradford, Curle began to feel the need to return to more direct involvement in international reconciliation, and so left the university in 1978, after five years. After his retirement, Curle continued to practice peacemaking and track two diplomacy, and worked with Quaker Peace and Service as a mediator in Pakistan, Zimbabwe, Northern Ireland, Sri Lanka, the Balkans and elsewhere. In 1983 a proposal formulated by Curle and others to assess the teaching of conflict resolution in schools was taken up by the Parliamentary Assembly of the Council of Europe as part of a plan to ensure compulsory education contain a focus on non-violent behaviour.

Curle and his wife Anne visited the former Yugoslavia several times during the Yugoslav Wars of 1991–2001. In 1992 Curle co-founded the Centre for Peace, Human Rights and Non-Violence in Osijek, Croatia, a contested area that was the site of significant violence. The organisation sought to cultivate a culture of non-violence through education, and provided civil rights education, community mediation, groups for parents, legal and practical support, peace education programmes, self-help groups, and programmes for survivors of domestic violence. In Županja, Croatia, a multi-ethnic community which had similarly seen conflict and dispossession, Curle co-founded Mir i dobro (Peace and Good), which sought to aid the local community in adjusting to the war's aftermath and to build peace. In his work in Croatia, Curle emphasised the necessity for aid workers to respond to the needs of communities and encouraged dialogue to discern what those needs were. As part of this emphasis, in 1996 he convened a workshop to explore ways to mitigate the effects of the war on Županja's children. A further workshop in 1997 sought to explore ways to develop a culture of non-violence and to facilitate reintegration as refugees returned to their homes. Barbara Mitchels has argued that these workshops combined peacemaking with aspects of counselling. Curle continued to visit Županja into the 2000s.

In his later years he was also influenced by Tibetan Buddhism and the 14th Dalai Lama. In the 1990s and 2000s he worked with the Oxford Research Group as an advisor and a patron. Later in his career he also revisited his earlier work with prisoners of war and reaffirmed his argument that efforts to heal the psychological wounds of war ought to form part of a holistic programme of interventions. In 2000 he was awarded the Gandhi International Peace Award.

== Thought ==
=== Overview ===
In the 1960s Curle published work on education and development that reflected conventional views about the relationship between economic modernisation and social progress. In this work he did, however, emphasise the role of the social and cultural, and in particular the concept of human potential, in development, rather than identifying development as a solely economic phenomenon. In this period he also sought to develop new teaching methods drawing on social psychology. From the late 1960s he came to question development per se, and questions relating to violence and conflict, informed by his experiences of the Indo-Pakistani War and the Nigerian Civil War, came to play a greater role in his work. Around this time, informed by the movement in opposition to the Vietnam War and the 1960s counterculture, he also looked to the roots of conflict that lay in developed countries. Curle's turn to peace studies was the result of these experiences, which instilled a desire to understand the causes of conflict.

=== Peace studies ===
In his work in peace studies, Curle developed an approach in which peace has both negative dimensions, relating to the prevention of violence, and positive dimensions, relating to the fulfilment of human needs and the freeing of human potential. Curle viewed peace in terms of human development rather than in terms of organisations or rules that would enforce peace. Finding the word "conflict" to be too ambiguous, Curle preferred to speak of "peaceful" and "unpeaceful" relationships, defining the former as relationships in which "the various parties did each other more good than harm", and the latter as those "doing more harm than good" to those involved. The development of peaceful relationships, rather than the containment of conflict, was at the core of Curle's conception of peace. While other peace researchers have tended to analyse social, political, and military systems, Curle's work focused on the values and attitudes of individuals within those systems. Curle played an important role in the emergence of peace studies as a separate field from international relations, and in the incorporation of insights from psychology, especially humanistic psychology, into the field. Curle's work also addressed the problems of occupational burnout and apathy among peace studies scholars and practitioners.

Curle saw peace studies as an interdisciplinary endeavour benefiting from a variety of backgrounds and skills. From the late 1960s he was aware of the work of Johan Galtung and Kenneth Boulding, whose work he saw as sharing a common goal with his own. Curle's work in peace studies was also influenced by the Russian esotericist P. D. Ouspensky and the Russian philosopher George Gurdjieff; by Buddhism (especially Tibetan Buddhism), Sufism and his involvement with the Quakers; and by the Brazilian educator Paulo Freire, who was his colleague at Harvard. In keeping with Quaker thought, Curle saw the Inner Light as a force in each human akin to a universal mind. Drawing on Buddhist philosophy, he argued that the three poisons (ignorance, greed and hatred) caused social alienation and formed the basis of most violence. Drawing on Vajrayana and Quakerism, he viewed all living things as connected, and believed that every human action has effects on humans' environment. He also emphasised the artistic and creative aspects of peacemaking and of writing on the subject.

=== Mediation and reconciliation ===
Mediation was, in Curle's view, the foremost tool of peacemaking. Its purpose, in Curle's account, was to eliminate misperceptions between parties in conflict and to allay violent emotions. Curle's proposed mediation process has four parts: first, mediators develop and improve communications; second, they provide information to, and between, the parties; third, they "befriend" the parties; and fourth, they encourage a willingness to engage in negotiations. Curle criticised "top down" forms of mediation as ineffectual, though, and argued mediation ought to be accompanied by the transformation of attitudes and of economic and social conditions. He saw this form of mediation as applicable on conflicts at all scales, from wars between nations to disputes within families. His theory of mediation draws on Quaker practices, on humanistic psychology, and on his own experiences in the field. It is distinct from John Burton's approach to conflict resolution, but shares with Burton several commitments: both saw the role of the mediator as one of structuring discussions and providing information, both thought mediation involved exploring and analysing the conflict in question, both used psychological principles to mitigate against misperceptions and misunderstandings, and both envisioned new understandings resulting that feed into the development of policy.

In his later works, published in the 1990s and 2000s, Curle continued to revise his theory of reconciliation and its role in peacemaking. His work with the Osijek Centre for Peace led to the realisation that the model of peacemaking by neutral parties that he had advanced in In the Middle (1986) was insufficiently nuanced to resolve the Yugoslav Wars, and that affected communities themselves ought to play a greater role in the process. He came to favour a form of conflict resolution in which outsiders' involvement would focus on training and supporting local peacemakers, and argued that effective peacemaking processes ought not to focus on the proliferation of peace treaties by elites, but rather ought to empower communities affected by war to construct peace "from below".

== Works ==
=== Educational Strategy for Developing Societies (1963) ===
Curle's Educational Strategy for Developing Societies (1963) is a review of the role of education in economic growth and social and political transformation.

=== Planning for Education in Pakistan (1966) ===
Planning for Education in Pakistan: A Personal Case Study (1966) is an account of Curle's experiences as an advisor to the Planning Commission of Pakistan in 1963 and 1964. In it, he assesses problems with education in Pakistan and discusses the role of foreign advisors to governments. Drawing on his experiences with the Planning Commission and with educational bodies, Curle shows significant differences between East Pakistan and West Pakistan in education and literacy. Curle presents those involved in educational planning as complex, conflicted figures rather than aloof arbiters of objective facts.

Richard S. Wheeler, reviewing the book in The Journal of Asian Studies, described Curle's assessment of Pakistan's educational problems as "authoritative" and the insight provided into the role of foreign advisors as "rewarding". J. A. Keats and Daphne M. Keats, writing in the Australian Journal of Education, characterised the book as "an unusual and in some ways courageous approach to a serious examination of the problems of educational planning in a newly developing country", but argued that Curle's subjective approach was not wholly successful and queried the omission of certain important individuals from his account. Keats and Keats concluded that while Curle "has succeeded in showing the interaction between persons and action, he has achieved this at the expense of an objectivity which might well have led to an even more valuable exposition."

=== Educational Problems of Developing Societies (1969) ===
Educational Problems of Developing Societies: With Case Studies of Ghana, Pakistan, and Nigeria was first published in 1969, then in a revised and expanded edition in 1973. The book comprises 12 essays on various topics. After introducing the educational problems faced by developing societies, Curle describes background conditions in these societies and factors in educational development in Pakistan. As in Educational Strategy for Developing Societies, Curle here understands development in social psychological terms. Drawing on his experiences in Pakistan, he argues that development requires flexibility and an appreciation of cultural differences, and that solely economic approaches to development risk fomenting conflict.

Woodhouse describes the book as the best illustration of "the progress of Curle's intellectual development toward the distinct field of peace research". Philip Foster, in his review in the International Journal of Comparative Sociology, argued that the essays show only limited awareness of broader debates in the field, and questioned Curle's methodology in some of the essays, but concluded "that the good far outweighs the less than satisfactory." Joseph Kivlin, meanwhile, reviewing the book in Social Forces, argued that it "does not contribute much that is new to the understanding" of developing societies' educational problems, and noted that several of its chapters are only tangentially connected to the topic of education.

=== Making Peace (1971) ===
Curle's Making Peace (1971) applies ideas from peace studies to his own experiences, explores the definition of peacemaking and considers what constitute peaceful and non-peaceful relationships and what cause them.

=== Education for Liberation (1973) ===
Curle's Education for Liberation was published in 1973. Drawing on his personal experiences and responding to the educational environment of the 1970s, and dealing with similar topics to Making Peace, Curle considers how education can contribute to the achievement of peace and social change. More so than in his previous works, Curle is critical of existing forms of education, which he sees as contributing to authoritarianism, social hierarchy and economic materialism. He identifies this as especially problematic in developing countries, where education is "attuned to the competitive and materialistic ideologies of the rich nations". The book was strongly influenced by Paulo Freire's thought, and contains an appendix contrasting Curle's views with those of B. F. Skinner.

Richard D'Aeth, reviewing the book in the British Journal of Educational Studies, described Curle's analysis as "humane and warmly personal" and the book as "a pleasure to study, despite its pessimism". In his review in the British Journal of Educational Psychology, Ken Pease expressed enthusiasm for the book but argued its use of the concept of awareness was too insubstantial to form "the cornerstone of an educational system".

=== The Fragile Voice of Love (2006) ===
Curle's final book, The Fragile Voice of Love (2006), was published shortly before he died. The book, which includes aspects of memoir and travelogue, offers a personal account of the human condition and human despair at the beginning of the 21st century. Curle comments on alienation, greed, and commercialism as causes of conflict, and proposes ways to combat certain damaging illusions, such as the idea that material wealth results in happiness. Drawing on the insights of the Buddha on the ultimate emptiness of reality, denial of which he identifies as the cause of suffering, Curle proposes that suffering can be overcome first by cultivating and applying virtue, and second by acquiring wisdom. Curle concludes by discussing globalisation, which he argues is driven by the desire for power and profit. Reviewing the book in Peace and Conflict, William H. Long described the book as "straight from the heart", and suggested "like your grandfather's advice, it's best to pay it some mind."

=== Other works ===
Mystics and Militants: A Study of Awareness, Identity and Social Action (1972) deals with similar themes to Making Peace and examines the personal beliefs, qualities and skills of peace makers. It also considers the psychological aspects of social action, social awareness and identity, and the inner and outer, or private and public, aspects of peacemaking. Curle's interest in the concepts of awareness and identity was based on his observation of people in conflict situations. Like Making Peace, Mystics and Militants contributed to Curle's reputation as an influential figure in the field of peace research. Both books contributed to the emergence of peace studies.

Peacemaking Public and Private (1978) continued to explore the question of the inner and outer aspects of peacemaking first taken up in Mystics and Militants.

True Justice (1981) draws on Quaker theology and Curle's own experiences as a peacemaker, and focuses on personal solutions rather than structural ones. It explores the question of human nature in relation to religion, and continues to consider public and private levels of peacemaking. Curle argues here that feelings of hatred, anger, jealousy and the like are not unchangeable features of any individual, but rather the result of failures to understand and develop their own potential. Michael Hare Duke, in his review for the New Internationalist, acknowledged the importance of the interpersonal phenomena on which Curle focuses, but argued that the book lacked "a clear recognition of the economic realities which lie behind any justice in the distribution of the world's resources."

In the Middle (1986) argues for the importance of mediation and reconciliation in both peace research and peacemaking practice. In it, Curle introduces his account of mediation as a four-part process, and identifies three types of activity as central to peacemaking: the development of co-operative economic and social systems, nonviolent opposition to violent and oppressive regimes, and the achievement of reconciliation between conflicting parties, including through mediation. In concluding, Curle proposes the creation of an international organisation within the United Nations dedicated to mediation, which would conduct research and provide mediation, training and resources.

Tools for Transformation (1990), like Making Peace and Mystics and Militants, frames conflict as a dynamic force capable of effecting changes in individuals and social structures. Barbara Mitchels and Tom Woodhouse argue that this perspective influenced the development of peace studies by providing a holistic account of conflict that goes beyond merely ending or preventing wars. In To Tame the Hydra (1999), Curle describes a global situation in which violence, successfully subdued, immediately flares up elsewhere, akin to the Hydra, a mythological monster which grew a new head each time one was cut off. Curle saw these outbreaks of violence as fuelled by the pursuit of money and power, and argued for the continuing necessity of peacemaking techniques.

Curle also wrote poetry and fiction. His collection Recognition and Reality: Reflections & Prose Poems was published in 1987. Norbert Koppensteiner described the volume as "a poetic transrationality." His poem "Indra's Net" (1999), named for the metaphor used in Buddhist philosophy, reflects on the ideas of human interconnection that also formed part of his work on peace.

== Personal life ==
Curle married Pamela Hobson in 1939. They had two daughters and divorced after the end of Curle's military service. In 1958 he married Anne Edie, a New Zealander who he had met in Dhaka during his travels. They had one daughter. Later in life he lived with Anne in London.

== Death and legacy ==
Curle died from acute leukaemia on 28 September 2006 in Wimbledon, London.

Barbara Mitchels' study of Curle, Love in Danger, was published in 2006. It was followed in 2016 by Adam Curle: Radical Peacemaker, a collection of Curle's writings edited by Tom Woodhouse and John Paul Lederach.

In a 2003 article Mitchels described Curle as "one of the pioneers of the academic study of peace". In his obituary in The Guardian, Tom Woodhouse wrote that "the legitimacy and growth of peace studies" would be Curle's "greatest and enduring legacy". Mitchels and Woodhouse argue Curle's works "were instrumental in establishing the legitimacy of peace studies in universities worldwide and in advancing the scholarly agenda of peace research." Lederach described Curle as "a beacon of orientation" for his own work and "one of the most important influences relevant to many of our contemporary debates" in peace studies.

== List of works ==
- The Role of Education in Developing Societies (1961)
- Educational Strategy for Developing Societies (1963), expanded and updated edition 1973
- Planning for Education in Pakistan: A Personal Case Study (1966)
- Educational Problems of Developing Societies: With Case Studies of Ghana, Pakistan, and Nigeria (1969) revised and expanded edition 1973
- Making Peace (1971)
- Mystics and Militants: A Study of Awareness, Identity and Social Action (1972)
- Education for Liberation (1973)
- Peacemaking Public and Private (1978)
- Preparation for Peace (1980)
- True Justice (1981)
- Recognition and Reality: Reflections & Prose Poems (1987)
- Tools for Transformation: A Personal Study (1990)
- To Tame the Hydra: Undermining the Culture of Violence (1995)
- In the Middle: Non-Official Mediation in Violent Situations (1986)
- Peacemaking: The Middle Way (1992)
- Another Way: Positive Responses to Contemporary Violence (1995)
- The Fragile Voice of Love (2006)
- Adam Curle: Radical Peacemaker (2016)

== See also ==
- List of peace activists

== Sources ==
- "Adam Curle". The Times. 3 October 2006.
- "The Adam Curle Archive". University of Bradford.
- Adams, Larry D. (1973). "Review of Making Peace by Adam Curle". Social Science Quarterly. 54 (2): 428–429. JSTOR 42859185.
- Barrett, Clive (May–June 2017). "A Pioneering Professor for Peace". Resurgence & Ecologist. No. 302.
- Boulton, Frank (2007). "Adam Curle, 1916–2006". Medicine, Conflict and Survival. 23 (1): 87–88. doi:10.1080/13623690601084815.
- Curle, Adam (1975). "Richard Curle". The Joseph Conrad Society (U.K.) Newsletter. 1 (6): 12–14. JSTOR 20870293.
- D'Aeth, Richard (1974). "Review of Education for Liberation by Adam Curle". British Journal of Educational Studies. 22 (2): 215–216. doi:10.2307/3119855. JSTOR 3119855.
- Foster, Philip (1972). "Review of Educational Problems of Developing Societies: With Case Studies of Ghana and Pakistan by Adam Curle". International Journal of Comparative Sociology. 13 (3–4): 226–227. doi:10.1163/156854272X00154.
- Gwilliam, Freda H. (1964). "Review of Educational Strategy for Developing Societies by Adam Curle". African Affairs. 63 (250): 76–77. doi:10.1093/oxfordjournals.afraf.a095181.
- Hare Duke, Michael (1 November 1982). "Review of Beyond Discrimination by Theo L. Westow and True Justice by Adam Curle". New Internationalist. No. 117.
- Keats, J. A.; Keats, Daphne M. (1968). "Review of Planning for Education in Pakistan: A Personal Case Study by Adam Curle". Australian Journal of Education. 12 (2): 208–210. doi:10.1177/000494416801200215. S2CID 147073876.
- Kivlin, Joseph (1971). "Review of Educational Problems of Developing Societies by Adam Curle". Social Forces. 50 (2): 282–283. doi:10.1093/sf/50.2.282.
- Koppensteiner, Norbert (2020). Transrational Peace Research and Elicitive Facilitation: The Self as (Re)Source. Springer. ISBN 9783030460679.
- Lederach, John Paul (3 May 2014). Remembering Forward: The Visionary Practical Scholarship of Adam Curle (PDF). Bradford University Conference. University of Bradford. Archived from the original (PDF) on 14 November 2020.
- Long, William J. (2007). "Joyfully Discovering the Emptiness of a Very Full Life". Peace and Conflict. 13 (1): 129–130. doi:10.1037/h0094029.
- McKinlay, Robert A. (1991). "From Harvard to Bradford". In Woodhouse, Tom (ed.). Peacemaking in a Troubled World. Berg. pp. 58–70. ISBN 9780854965946 – via Internet Archive.
- Mitchels, Barbara (2003). "Healing the Wounds of War and More: An Integrative Approach to Peace—The Work of Adam Curle and Others with Mir i Dobro in Županja, Croatia". British Journal of Guidance & Counselling. 31 (4): 403–416. doi:10.1080/03069880310001609286. S2CID 143118761.
- Mitchels, Barbara; Woodhouse, Tom (2010). "Curle, Adam". In Young, Nigel J. (ed.). The Oxford International Encyclopedia of Peace. Oxford University Press.
- Pease, K. (1975). "Review of Education for Liberation by Adam Curle". British Journal of Educational Psychology. 45 (1): 92. doi:10.1111/j.2044-8279.1975.tb02302.x.
- Pettigrew, John (1991). "Quaker Mediation". In Woodhouse, Tom (ed.). Peacemaking in a Troubled World. Berg. pp. 226–246. ISBN 9780854965946 – via Internet Archive.
- Ramsbotham, Oliver; Woodhouse, Tom; Miall, Hugh (2011). Contemporary Conflict Resolution: The Prevention, Management and Transformation of Deadly Conflicts (3rd ed.). Polity Press. ISBN 9780745649733.
- Randle, Michael (1 February 2017). "Review of Adam Curle: Radical Peacemaker, edited by Tom Woodhouse and John Paul Lederach". Peace News. No. 2602–2603.
- Wheeler, Richard S. (1966). "Review of Planning for Education in Pakistan: A Personal Case Study by Adam Curle". The Journal of Asian Studies. 26 (1): 141–142. doi:10.2307/2051871. JSTOR 2051871. S2CID 161290897.
- Woodhouse, Tom (1991a). "Introduction". In Woodhouse, Tom (ed.). Peacemaking in a Troubled World. Berg. pp. 1–13. ISBN 9780854965946 – via Internet Archive.
- Woodhouse, Tom (1991b). "Making Peace: The Work of Adam Curle". In Woodhouse, Tom (ed.). Peacemaking in a Troubled World. Berg. pp. 30–57. ISBN 9780854965946 – via Internet Archive.
- Woodhouse, Tom (4 October 2006). "Adam Curle". The Guardian.
- Woodhouse, Tom (2010). "Adam Curle: Radical Peacemaker and Pioneer of Peace Studies". Journal of Conflictology. 1 (1): 1–8.
- Yarrow, C. H. Mike (1978). Quaker Experiences in International Conciliation. Yale University Press. ISBN 9780300022605. JSTOR j.ctt1dszwxd.
