= Aleksandras =

Aleksandras is a Lithuanian male given name derived from Alexander. People with this name include:

- Alexander Jagiellon (1461–1506), Grand Duke of Lithuania and King of Poland
- Aleksandras Abišala (born 1955), former Prime Minister of Lithuania
- Aleksandras Ambrazevičius (born 1953), Lithuanian politician
- Aleksandras Antipovas (born 1955), long distance runner
- Aleksandras Dičpetris (1906–1968), Lithuanian poet and educator
- Aleksandras Lileikis (1907–2000), Lithuanian Holocaust perpetrator
- Aleksandras Fromas-Gužutis (also known as Gužutis; 1822–1900), Lithuanian writer
- Aleksandras Machtas (1892–1972), chess master
- Aleksandras Plechavičius (1897–1942), Lithuanian military officer
- Aleksandras Stulginskis (1885–1969), President of Lithuania
- Aleksandras Štromas (1931–1999), political scientist
