= Luella Buros =

American painter, sculptor, photographer, and peace activist

Luella Gubrud Buros was an American painter, sculptor, photographer, and peace activist. She worked to continue her husband Oscar Buros's legacy.

Luella Gubrud Buros (September 10, 1901 – June 22, 1995) was an American painter, sculptor, photographer, and peace activist. As a founding partner in The Gryphon Press, Buros designed the layout for the Mental Measurements Yearbook, a series of reference volumes published together with her husband, psychometrician Oscar Krisen Buros.

== Early life ==
Buros was born in Canby, Minnesota, the daughter of Anlaug (Ella) Ferguson and Luaritz (Lewis) M. Gubrud. Her early life was spent in Canby, Minnesota, and Ambrose, North Dakota.

== Education ==
She was educated at Ohio State University; Columbia University, Teachers College; and Rutgers University.

== Family life ==
Buros married Oscar Krisen Buros on December 21, 1925. The couple lived in Superior, Wisconsin; New York City; Millburn, New Jersey; Kampala, Uganda; Nairobi, Kenya; Highland Park, New Jersey; and New Hope, Pennsylvania. They were especially drawn to Africa and traveled there a total of 11 times, including two trips occasioned by Oscar’s academic pursuits that lasted for one and two years. As a widow, Luella’s final home was in Tucson, Arizona.

== Professional life ==
As an artist, Buros worked primarily in watercolors and oils but also in sculpture and photography. In addition, she did carpentry and made furniture, including tables, bookcases, and cabinets. Her paintings won awards and were exhibited in many major cities, including the Metropolitan Museum of Art in New York City, The Art Institute of Chicago, Corcoran Gallery of Art in Washington DC, Stedelijke Museum Amsterdam, the Golden Gate International Exhibition of Watercolors in San Francisco as well as in national and international traveling expositions. She painted what she saw, consistent with the realism style. Many of her watercolors depict neighborhood scenes in Highland Park. “On her oils, people are treated with dignity and respect” (p. 313). A number of her original paintings are on display throughout the Buros Center for Testing in offices, the conference room, and the library. She was the recipient of numerous art awards and honors, including the Association for Assessment in Counseling's Exemplary Practices Award, which she received in 1995.

Despite her success in these artistic endeavors, in the mid 1930s Buros joined her husband in his professional mission in the field of measurement. For a while she continued painting but eventually abandoned her career to work exclusively as her husband’s partner. Buros was responsible for creating the design and layout template for the Yearbooks, which is still used today. From 1938 to 1978, the couple published eight volumes of the Mental Measurements Yearbook series out of the basement of their home in Highland Park, New Jersey.

== Legacy ==
When Oscar Buros died in 1978, with the 8th MMY not quite completed, Luella Buros finished the work by herself, publishing the book on schedule. She is the only woman named to the "Famous Women in Testing" roster who did not have an advanced degree, let alone in a measurement-related field. Luella Buros ensured that her husband's legacy would continue and his work be carried on in perpetuity. In 1979 she oversaw the process of moving the Buros Institute, as the Center was then called, along with all its holdings, to the University of Nebraska-Lincoln. In 1994, Buros provided a substantial gift to expand the original mission beyond the evaluation of commercially available tests.

Luella Buros was the founding contributor to the journal, Peace and Conflict: Journal of Peace Psychology, published currently by the American Psychological Association (APA). In describing her commitment to social causes, psychologist Milton Schwebel (1992) characterized Buros as “a pillar of strength, her principles uneroded by age or economic well-being, her determination to struggle against social evils undiminished.” She funded an endowment to ensure the continuation of the journal in perpetuity. The journal became—and continues to be—the official journal of APA’s Division 48: Society for the Study of Peace, Conflict and Violence: Peace Psychology Division. Shortly after her second major contribution to this cause, Buros died, on June 22, 1995.
