= David Stenhouse =

Science writer and author (1932–2013)

- Born: 23 May 1932; Sutton, Surrey, England
- Died: 27 August 2013 (aged 81); Palmerston North, Manawatu, New Zealand
- Occupation: Author

David Stenhouse (born 23 May 1932, in Sutton, Surrey, England) was an English philosopher and biologist. He proposed the "4-factor" theory of evolutionary intelligence and was active in ethology, education, evolutionary biology and philosophy of science in Australia and New Zealand.

He died after a short illness on 27 August 2013 in Palmerston North, New Zealand.

== Early life and family ==
Stenhouse spent his childhood on the outskirts of London and in South-West Scotland, where his parents were from. His paternal grandfather, also called David, was the headmaster of the Sandbank school. The son of J.F.M. & M.M. Stenhouse, he has one sister, Joyce. His parents moved to New Zealand when he was in his teens. He has 7 children from 2 marriages. His eldest son, Dr. John Stenhouse, was a lecturer in History at Massey University, and is currently Associate Professor in History at the University of Otago.

== Work ==
After taking degrees in both Philosophy (under John Passmore) and Zoology at the University of Otago, he lectured at universities in New Zealand and Australia – in the Department of Zoology at The University of Queensland, the Department of Education at Massey University, and the Department of Psychology at Massey University. He is the author of a number of books and articles.

== Selected publications ==
=== Books ===
- Crisis in Abundance, published in 1966 (Heinemann).
- Unstated assumptions in education : a cross-cultural investigation, published in 1972 (ISBN 9780457012108).
- The Evolution of Intelligence : A general theory and some of its implications, published in 1974 (Allen and Unwin, ISBN 978-0-04-575017-7 and ISBN 978-0-06-496518-7) (Japanese edition: "Chino no shinka : chiteki kodo no ippan riron"; Italian edition).
- Active Philosophy in Education and Science: Paradigms and Language-Games, published in 1985 (Cambridge, MA: Allen and Unwin. ISBN 978-0-04-370142-3 and ISBN 978-0-04-370141-6).

=== Articles ===
- Stenhouse, David (1960), "The Redpoll in New Zealand : Interbreeding Sub-species", Nature, 186 (4723): 488–490, Bibcode:1960Natur.186..488S, doi:10.1038/186488a0, S2CID 4151689
- Stenhouse, David (1962), "A New Habit of the Redpoll Carduelis Flammea in New Zealand", Ibis, 104 (2): 250–252, doi:10.1111/j.1474-919X.1962.tb08652.x
- "TAXONOMIC STATUS OF THE NEW ZEALAND REDPOLL, CARDUELIS FLAMMEA: A REASSESSMENT" (PDF), Notornis, 10 (2): 61–67, 1962, archived from the original (PDF) on 28 January 2015
- Stenhouse, David (1963), "Breeding attempt of Struthidea in Brisbane", Emu, 63 (4): 283–286, doi:10.1071/mu963283
- Stenhouse, David (1965), "Teleonomic Teaching and the Supply of Biologists", Nature, 206 (4987): 867–868, Bibcode:1965Natur.206..867S, doi:10.1038/206867a0, PMID 5839839, S2CID 45424458
- Stenhouse, David (1965), "A general theory for the evolution of intelligent behaviour.", Nature, 208 (5012): 815, Bibcode:1965Natur.208..815S, doi:10.1038/208815a0, PMID 5868903
- Stenhouse, David (1968), "O'Connor's Paradox and the Teaching of Educational Philosophy", British Journal of Educational Studies, 16 (3): 243–257, doi:10.1080/00071005.1968.9973223, JSTOR 3119288
- Stenhouse, David (1969), "Good Persons, Good Teachers and Language-Games", Educational Philosophy and Theory, 1 (1): 41–50, doi:10.1111/j.1469-5812.1969.tb00366.x
- Stenhouse, David (1971), "Scientific Creativity: "Normal" or "Revolutionary", Australian Journal of Education, 15 (2): 171–84, doi:10.1177/000494417101500205, S2CID 147436423
- Stenhouse, David (1976), "Objective Tests, Creativity and Language Games", Australian Journal of Education, 20 (2): 169–83, doi:10.1177/000494417602000204, S2CID 143929555
- Stenhouse, David (1976), "Evolutionary, Adaptive, and Ethogical Considerations in the Assessment of Intelligence", Interchange, 7 (3): 51–61, doi:10.1007/bf02142632, S2CID 144724403
- D Stenhouse, MJR Gaffikin (1976), "Behavioural accounting and the changing nature of the human behavioural/social sciences : some implications of the ethological revolution", Occasional Paper, Massey University, New Zealand.
- Stenhouse, David (1977), "Human Ethology, Education, and Learning", Interchange, 8 (3): 89–101, doi:10.1007/bf01189297, S2CID 144382806
- Stenhouse, David (1979), "The Wittgensteinian Revolution and Linguistic Philosophy: Some Implications for Education and Educational Philosophy", PhD Thesis, Massey University, New Zealand.
- Stenhouse, David (1986), "Conceptual Change in Science Education: Paradigms and Language-Games", Science Education, 70 (4): 413–25, Bibcode:1986SciEd..70..413S, doi:10.1002/sce.3730700407
