= Oscar Krisen Buros =

Oscar Krisen Buros (1905-1978) was the creator, editor, and publisher of The Mental Measurements Yearbook (MMY) and Tests in Print (TIP) series, Buros began an editorship in the 1930s that would extend for more than 40 years and significantly affect the history of the commercial testing industry. Often referred to as the Consumer Reports of the testing industry, Buros’ Yearbooks have been extremely influential on the quality of psychological and educational tests.

== Early life ==
Oscar Krisen Buros was born on June 14, 1905, in Lake Nebagamon, Wisconsin, the fourth of nine children born to Herman and Tone Buros, immigrants from Norway.

== Higher education ==
He earned a B.S. with distinction in educational administration and supervision from the University of Minnesota in 1925. He later attended Columbia University, where in 1928 he earned his master's degree in psychology with a heavy emphasis on statistics and measurement.

== Academic career and achievements ==
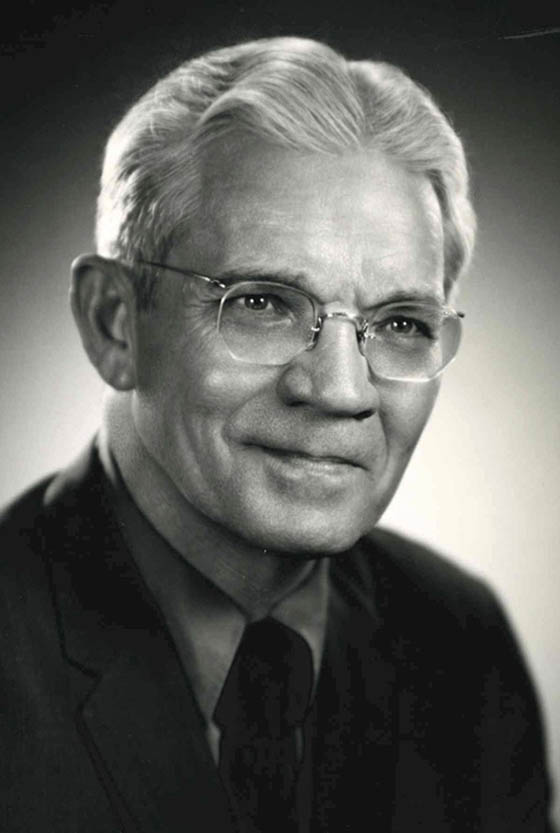
Oscar Kristen Buros is the creator of The Mental Measurements Yearbook and Tests in Print. His legacy of improving the science and practice of testing and assessment continues at the Buros Center for Testing.

He planned to earn a doctoral degree in statistics, but the Great Depression prevented him from pursuing this ambition. Instead, he became a teacher and then a principal at an elementary school. He became a professor at Rutgers University in 1929 and remained a faculty member there until his retirement in 1965. He taught courses in testing and statistical methods for the Educational Psychology Department. From 1942 to 1945 he served as an academic examination officer for a nascent military testing program. He was a Senior Fulbright Lecturer in Statistics (1956-1957) at Makere College, Kampala, Uganda. From 1965 to 1967, he was a visiting professor at the University College at the University of East Africa in Nairobi, Kenya.

During the mid-1920s, Buros studied statistics on his own and began publishing in that field. The use of cognitive ability tests during World War I had paved the way for dramatic increases in psychological and educational tests. These increases were apparent in the late 1920s as was the appearance of books critiquing these tests. Oscar noted that many reviews of tests were highly subjective, with little quantitative evidence to support the positions taken by the reviewers. He had questioned much of what was being taught about testing since he was an undergraduate and had authored a paper entitled, “Common Fallacies in Standardized Testing.” He wanted to do something to improve the quality and quantity of information being disseminated about psychological and educational tests and to encourage the testing profession to “step up” and monitor its own practices in order to better serve and protect test users.

With this desire for improvement in mind, Buros set out to publish the first collection of critical reviews of tests. Oscar's first attempt at meeting this goal took the form of The Nineteen Thirty Eight Mental Measurements Yearbook. In the foreword, Oscar expressed his hope that reviews of tests would lead to improvements in test manuals, descriptions of the technical quality of tests, and test-related research that ultimately would benefit prospective users of those tests. Portions of his foreword indicate the goals he hoped to accomplish and the actions he hoped to inspire through this series of publications.

The Mental Measurements Yearbooks should have a most salutary effect upon the use of standard tests in education and psychology. Test users will be given much needed help in selecting tests which are most likely to meet their own needs. The publication of frankly critical test reviews is likely to cause authors and publishers to publish fewer but better tests. Test users have every right to demand that test authors and publishers present full particulars concerning the methods used in constructing and validating the tests which they place on the market. Tests not accompanied by detailed data on their construction, validation, uses, and limitations should be suspect. (pp. xiii-xiv)

These first two yearbooks were published under the imprint The Mental Measurements Yearbook. In 1941 the Buroses established The Gryphon Press and published the next six yearbooks under this imprint—despite the interruption and delay that Oscar's military service in WWII caused on work for The Third Mental Measurements Yearbook (1949)—working out of their two-story home in Highland Park, New Jersey.

== Oscar Buros's legacy ==
Oscar Buros died on March 19, 1978, before the completion of the 8th MMY. His wife Luella Gubrud Buros saw to it that the book—the last to bear her husband's name on the cover—was published on schedule, later that same year. The inscription his lifelong passion for the work, up until the last week of his life, and his hope that it would continue to benefit the profession.

Luella Buros continued her support of Oscar's long-standing goals of improved measurement and testing practices. Following a national search and offers from several prominent universities, the Institute of Mental Measurements transferred its considerable testing archives to the University of Nebraska–Lincoln, and book publication restarted. Now known as the Buros Center for Testing, Oscar's legacy continues there today.
