= Michael Harbottle =

English cricketer and British Army officer (1917–1997)

Personal information
- Full name: Michael Neale Harbottle
- Born: 7 February 1917; Littlehampton, Sussex, England
- Died: 30 April 1997 (aged 80); Oxford, Oxfordshire, England
- Batting: Left-handed
- Bowling: Slow left-arm orthodox

Domestic team information
- Years: Team
- 1938: Army
- 1936–1956: Dorset

Career statistics
Competition	First-class
Matches	1
Runs scored	156
Batting average	156.00
100s/50s	1/0
Top score	156
Balls bowled	24
Wickets	0
Bowling average	–
5 wickets in innings	–
10 wickets in match	–
Best bowling	–
Catches/stumpings	0/–
- Source: Cricinfo, 2 June 2011

Brigadier Michael Neale Harbottle, OBE (7 February 1917 – 30 April 1997) was a senior British Army officer who was chief of staff of the United Nations Peacekeeping Force in Cyprus from 1966 to 1968, a peace campaigner and amateur cricketer.

== Early life ==
Harbottle was born in Littlehampton, Sussex, and educated at Marlborough College from 1930 to 1935. He was rejected by the Navy because he suffered from bunions but he was accepted by the Royal Military College, Sandhurst, where he studied from 1935 to 1937. He was commissioned into the Oxfordshire and Buckinghamshire Light Infantry in August 1937.

== Cricket career ==
Harbottle was a left-handed batsman who bowled slow left-arm orthodox. He was a talented player at Marlborough, and captained the Sandhurst XI.

He played a first-class cricket match for the Army in 1937 against Oxford University. He had considerable success in the match, scoring 156 runs in his only first-class innings, before being dismissed by Desmond Eagar. He also played for Dorset at a Minor counties level from 1937 to 1956, although infrequently due to his military commitments. He played cricket for the army until 1959 and captained the team in that year.

He is the only English cricketer to score a century in his only first-class innings.

== Military career ==
Harbottle served in Italy during the Second World War as a company commander. He was wounded and in 1944 received a Mention in Despatches. Harbottle commanded the 1st Green Jackets (43rd and 52nd) at Knook Camp, near Warminster, Wiltshire, from 1959 to 1962 and was garrison commander in Aden from 1962 to 1964. He commanded 129 Infantry Brigade, TA, at Oxford, from 1964 to 1966. Harbottle was chief of staff of the UN Peacekeeping Force in Cyprus from 1966 to 1968. After two years in the post, the UN Secretary General U Thant requested that Harbottle remain as chief of staff of the UN Force in Cyprus; however, the Ministry of Defence declined to support his continuation in the role. He retired from the army in 1968.

He became chief security officer for a British-owned mining subsidiary of the Consolidated African Selection Trust in Sierra Leone. He wrote a book in 1976 titled The Knaves of Diamonds in which he provided his account of events in Sierra Leone during his time there.

== Peace campaigner ==
Harbottle was vice president of the International Peace Academy from 1971 to 1973. Harbottle was appointed to a position in the University of Bradford's Department of Peace Studies by Professor Adam Curle soon after the department's founding in 1973. In 1978 he collated the Peacekeeper's Handbook, which the United Nations subsequently issued to more than 70 countries. He was vice president of the United Nations Association UK from 1974, and general secretary of the World Disarmament Campaign from 1980 to 1982. Harbottle took part in setting up Generals (Retired) for Peace and Disarmament in 1981. In 1983, he and his wife Eirwen Harbottle set up the Centre for International Peacebuilding. The fall of the Berlin Wall in November 1989 led to Harbottle becoming the coordinator for the Worldwide Consultative Association of Retired Generals and Admirals from 1991. Harbottle was the author and coauthor of a number of books on the United Nations, Peacekeeping and Disarmament. He lived in Chipping Norton, Oxfordshire. He was appointed OBE in 1959.

Harbottle married Alison Humfress in 1940, with whom he was to have one son and one daughter. He married Eirwen Simonds in 1972.

He died on 30 April 1997. A memorial service was held at St James's Church, Piccadilly, London, on 8 July 1997. The memorial address was given by Major-General James Lunt CBE.

== Publications ==
- The Impartial Soldier, London; New York : Oxford University Press, 1970 ISBN 0192149830
- The Blue Berets, London : Leo Cooper, 1971 ISBN 0850520789
