= Making Peace =

1971 book by Adam Curle

- Author: Adam Curle
- Language: English
- Publisher: Harper and Row
- Publication date: 1971

Making Peace is a book by the British peace studies scholar Adam Curle, first published in 1971.

== Overview ==
Making Peace was written during a sabbatical year Curle spent at the Richardson Institute in 1969–70. The book applies ideas from peace studies to Curle's own experiences, explores the definition of peacemaking and considers what constitute peaceful and non-peaceful relationships and what cause them. Curle draws on an approach associated with the Tavistock Institute of Human Relations during Curle's time there, which combined elements of psychoanalysis with aspects of typological psychology. Curle defines peacemaking as the process of transforming human relationships from unpeaceful forms to peaceful ones.

The first part of the book presents case studies of unpeaceful relationships and peacemaking processes, while the second part outlines aspects of peacemaking. The case studies range from interpersonal relationships between spouses to civil and international wars. Part of the book concentrates on conciliation and mediation, skills Curle saw as insufficiently understood and developed, and draws on social and humanistic psychology. Elsewhere Curle emphasises the role of development in creating positive peace. He describes private diplomacy as a practice distinguished by "its absolute separation from political interest and hence its potentiality to permit an open and relaxed relationship between human beings."

In Making Peace Curle outlines an "objectivist" theory of conflict, according to which conflicts can exist even when the parties in conflict are unaware of them (as opposed to "subjectivists" who believe a conflict must be perceived as such by the participants in order to exist). He argues that conflicts can exist regardless of their participants' conscious desires when the relationships in which they are engaged are unpeaceful or exploitative, and that observers' assessments of situations as peaceful or conflictual are ultimately value-driven and subjective.

== Critical reception ==
Christopher Mitchell described the book as "the clearest (and in many senses the most honest) exposition of the objectivist position" in peace studies. Reviewing the book in Social Science Quarterly, Larry D. Adams described Curle's practical rather than scholarly approach as the book's greatest strength or weakness, depending on the reader's disposition, and suggested that policymakers and non-experts would be more likely to find the book interesting social scientists. Grady H. Nunn, reviewing it in The Journal of Politics, described the book's scope as "awesomely unconventional". In his review in International Affairs, Michael Banton described the book as unduly idealistic and "too personal" to generate in the reader "the kind of theoretical understanding which, by its ability to generate good hypotheses, stimulates self-sustaining advance." Tom Woodhouse described the book's "focus on relationships as the subject of peace" as that "which above all distinguishes and characterises" Curle's work.

== Impact ==
Making Peace contributed to the emergence of the field of peace studies and established Curle as a leading figure in the field. The book's approach informed the path later taken by the Department of Peace Studies at the University of Bradford.
