= Tom Stonier =

Tom "Ted" Stonier (29 April 1927 – 15 June 1999) was a German biologist, philosopher, information theorist, educator and pacifist. His scientific studies centered on information provide a plausible explanation to the evolutionist concepts of Pierre Teilhard de Chardin. He drafts the principle of the transformation of a primordial energetic soup (big bang) towards a pure informational state (Chardin's Omega Point). He places the current material world in this entropic, dynamical evolution of the energy-matter-information equilibrium.

Stonier was born in Hamburg to a French mother and German-Jewish father, and fled with his family to New York in 1939. He studied biology at Drew University and received his PhD from Yale University in 1955. He began his academic career at Rockefeller University.

Stonier taught biology at Manhattan College from 1962. His book Nuclear Disaster, a study of the effects of a hypothetical nuclear strike on New York City, was published in 1964. He was appointed to a position as a visiting professor in the University of Bradford's Department of Peace Studies by Professor Adam Curle soon after the Department's founding in 1973. Stonier would later become head of Bradford's School of Science and Society, another new department. In the 1970s he also campaigned for the increased use of computers in the classroom.

In 1985 he co-founded, with Dave Catlin, Valiant Technology, a London-based company which designed LOGO Programming Language based Turtle robots the Valiant Turtle and the Roamer educational robot.

== Books ==
- Nuclear Disaster (1964)
- The Wealth of Information: A Profile of the Post-Industrial Economy (1983)
- Information and the Internal Structure of the Universe (1990)
- Beyond Information: The Natural History of Intelligence (1992)
- Information and Meaning: An Evolutionary Perspective (1997)

== See also ==
- Science and technology studies
