= Kurt F. Geisinger =

American psychology professor

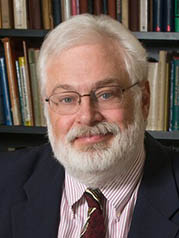
- Geisinger in 2021
- Born: Kurt F. Geisinger
- Scientific career
- Fields: Psychology
- Workplaces: University of Nebraska–Lincoln

Kurt F. Geisinger is an American psychologist, writer, and research professor known for his work on psychological testing and assessment. Currently serving as the Director of the Buros Center for Testing at the University of Nebraska–Lincoln. He has also been honored as the Meierhenry Distinguished University Professor at the same institution.

== Education ==
Geisinger holds a B.A. from Davidson College, M.A. from University of Georgia, and a Ph.D. from Pennsylvania State University. Geisinger also received the Alumni Fellow Award from the Pennsylvania State University.

== Career ==
Geisinger has held various academic positions throughout his distinguished career. He served as a professor of psychology and chair of the Psychology Department at Fordham University from 1977 to 1992. Subsequently, he assumed the role of Dean of Arts and Sciences at SUNY-Oswego from 1992 to 1997, followed by Vice President for Academic Affairs at Le Moyne College and the University of St. Thomas (Texas) from 1997 to 2006. Throughout his academic appointments, he maintained the rank of Professor of Psychology. Geisinger's areas of expertise encompass testing and psychometric theory, testing of individuals with disabilities and language minorities, performance assessment, legal issues in testing, and high-stakes tests for admissions and personnel selection.

Geisinger received Jacob Cohen Award for Distinguished Teaching and Mentoring from Division 5 of the American Psychological Association.

Geisinger has served as the past president of the International Test Commission, Division 5 (Quantitative and Qualitative Methodology) of the American Psychological Association and was president of the American Psychological Association's division of International Psychology. Geisinger held the position of president of Division 2 (Assessment and Evaluation) from 2018 to 2022 in International Association of Applied Psychology.

== Selected books ==
- College Admissions and Admissions Testing in a Time of Transformational Change (2023)
- Fairness in Educational and Psychological Testing: Examining Theoretical, Research, Practice, and Policy Implications of the 2014 Standards (2022)
- Tests in Print X (2022)
- The Twenty-First Mental Measurements Yearbook (2021)
- The Eighteenth Mental Measurements Yearbook (2010)

== Selected publications ==
- "Social Responsibility, Fairness, and College Admissions Tests: A Commentary" (2021)
- "Intended and Unintended Meanings of Validity: Some Clarifying Comments" (2016)
- "Psychometric Issues in Testing Students with Disabilities" (1994)
- "The Metamorphosis in Test Validation" (1992)
