= Aleksandras Štromas =

Lithuanian political scientist (1931–1999)

Alexander Shtromas
- Aleksandras Štromas
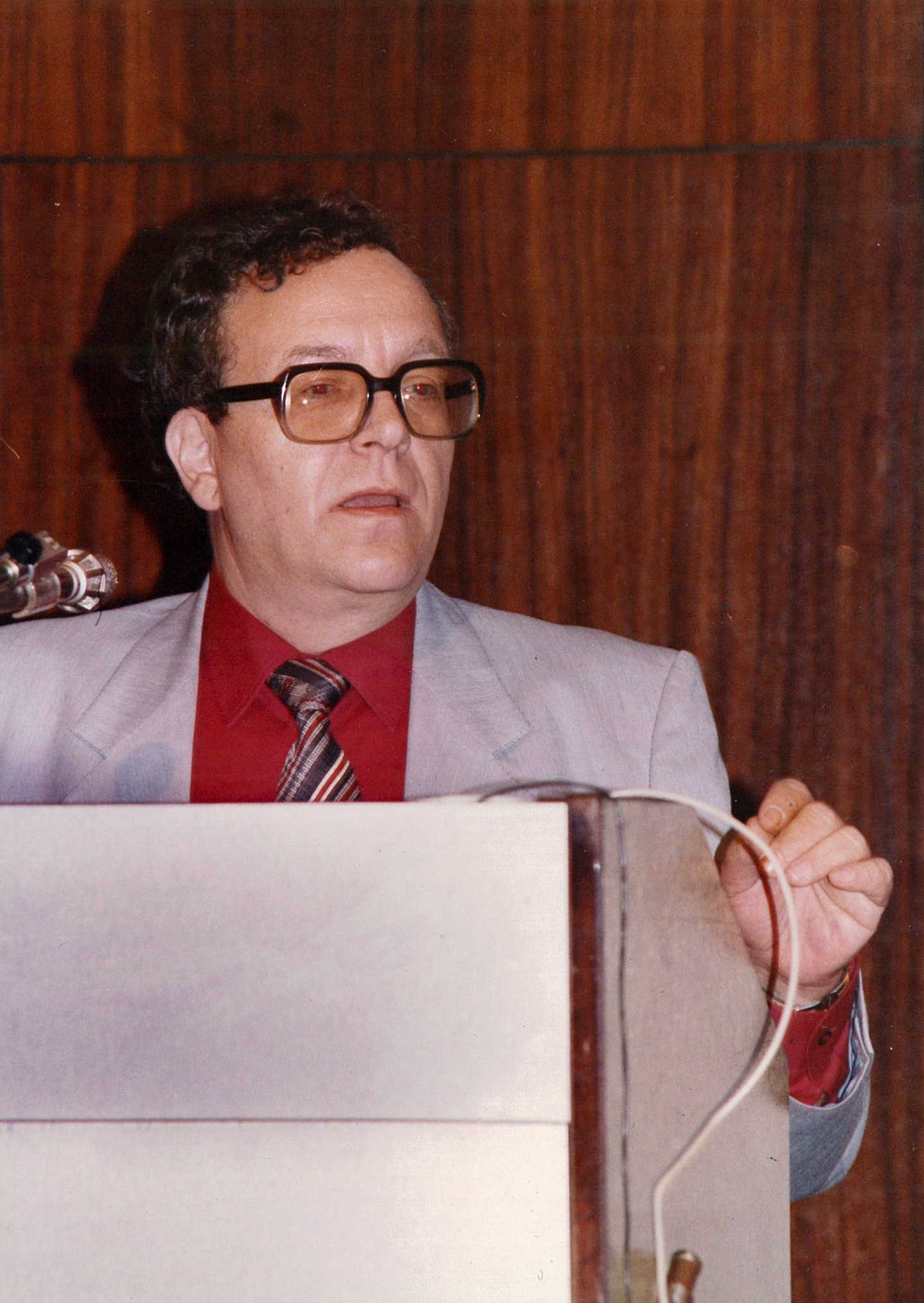
- Born: April 4, 1931; Kaunas, Lithuania
- Died: June 12, 1999 (aged 68); Chicago, Illinois, U.S.
- Education: Vilnius University; Moscow State University
- Known for: Human rights activism with participation in dissident movement in the Soviet Union
- Scientific career
- Fields: Political Science
- Workplaces: Bradford University; Salford University; Hillsdale College

Alexander Shtromas (Lithuanian: Aleksandras Štromas; 4 April 1931 in Kaunas, Lithuania – 12 June 1999 in Chicago) was a prominent Lithuanian political scientist, dissident, professor and author.

Alexander Štromas was a cousin of Irena Veisaitė, Holocaust survivor and later Lithuanian scholar of German literature. Irena's mother and Alexander's father were siblings.

== Biography ==
Shtromas was born in Kaunas, Lithuania. During the Nazi occupation of Lithuania he was imprisoned in the ghetto. After he was saved from the ghetto, Shtromas was harbored by Antanas Sniečkus. He studied at Vilnius University, and later finished at Moscow State University. In 1964 Shtromas defended his doctoral thesis in law. Soon afterward Shtromas became a critic of the Soviet regime and was forced to emigrate. In 1973 he settled in the United Kingdom. There, he was appointed to a position in the Department of Peace Studies at the University of Bradford by Adam Curle. He later worked at Salford University, and, until his death, at Hillsdale College. Aleksandras Shtromas died on 12 June 1999 in the US, and was interred in Petrašiūnai Cemetery in Kaunas. A book with tributes by fellow dissidents, academic colleagues and former students (mainly in English but also in Lithuanian and Russian) was published in 2008 in Lithuania, edited by Leonidas Donskis (XX a. žmogus: Aleksandro Štromo portretai).

== Books in English ==
- Who are the Soviet dissidents? (2 ed.). University of Bradford. 1979 [1977]. ISBN 9780901945358.
- Political change and social development: the case of the Soviet Union (1981)
- To fight communism: why and how? (1985)
- The Soviet Union and the challenge of the future (edited with Morton A. Kaplan, 1988)
- The end of "isms"?: reflections on the fate of ideological politics after Communism's collapse (edited, 1994)
- Totalitarianism and the prospects for world order: closing the door on the twentieth century (2003)

== Articles ==
- Shtromas, Alexander (Summer–Autumn 1979). "Dissent and political change in the Soviet Union". Studies in Comparative Communism. 12 (2–3): 212–244. doi:10.1016/0039-3592(79)90010-3.
- Shtromas, Alexander (Autumn–Winter 1987). "Dissent, nationalism, and the Soviet future". Studies in Comparative Communism. 20 (3–4): 277–285.
