= Educational Strategy for Developing Societies =

Economics book

Educational Strategy for Developing Societies: A Study of Educational and Social Factors in Relation to Economic Growth
- Author: Adam Curle
- Language: English
- Publisher: Tavistock Publications
- Publication date: 1963

Educational Strategy for Developing Societies: A Study of Educational and Social Factors in Relation to Economic Growth is a book by the British peace studies scholar Adam Curle, first published in 1963.

== Overview ==
The book is a review of the role of education in economic growth and social and political transformation. Curle described the aim of the book as "to show that an underdeveloped society is literally an underdeveloped society, not merely an underdeveloped economy". The book argues that low levels of education in developing countries are a hindrance to economic growth, and calls for the development of training and education programmes in such societies. Curle argues that sustained economic growth requires investment in community development, agricultural extension, and training, and the emergence of a new socioeconomic class unburdened by traditional constraints and able to maintain the momentum of development. While Curle generally accepted the conventional wisdom of Western development models here, he also queried the assumption that development was primarily an economic matter, and emphasised the importance of sociological and psychological phenomena. Development, Curle argues, should not be measured in terms of economic growth but rather in social and cultural terms, and structural functionalism was insufficient to explain complex processes of social change. The replacement of traditional social values by values of equality and social justice, Curle argues, can mitigate the risk of the new class being primarily self-interested.

Tom Woodhouse attributed Curle's willingness to rethink dominant accounts of development to his experiences in Africa and Asia and the interdisciplinary character of his academic career to that point. Woodhouse also saw in Educational Strategy hints to the question of the roots of conflict which became more central to Curle's thought in the subsequent years. A second edition was published in 1970, featuring a new introduction in which Curle noted the increase in illiteracy and international equality in the preceding years, and the inefficacy of aid measures.

== Critical reception ==
R. Cranford Pratt, reviewing the book in the Journal of Modern African Studies, described it as "provocative" but "too general and too short ... unable to deal comprehensively with any of the questions [Curle] raises, and often ... either over-simple or unconvincingly categorical." Reviewing the book in African Affairs, Freda H. Gwilliam concluded it would be "of very great value to anyone who is concerned with diagnosing the needs of developing countries or who is called to play a part in meeting those needs". In his review in International Affairs, David Blelloch argued that the book was not specific enough to be useful and lacks "a fully integrated conception of development as an evolutionary process for each individual society as a whole".
