= Hamzat Ahmadu =

Nigerian diplomat

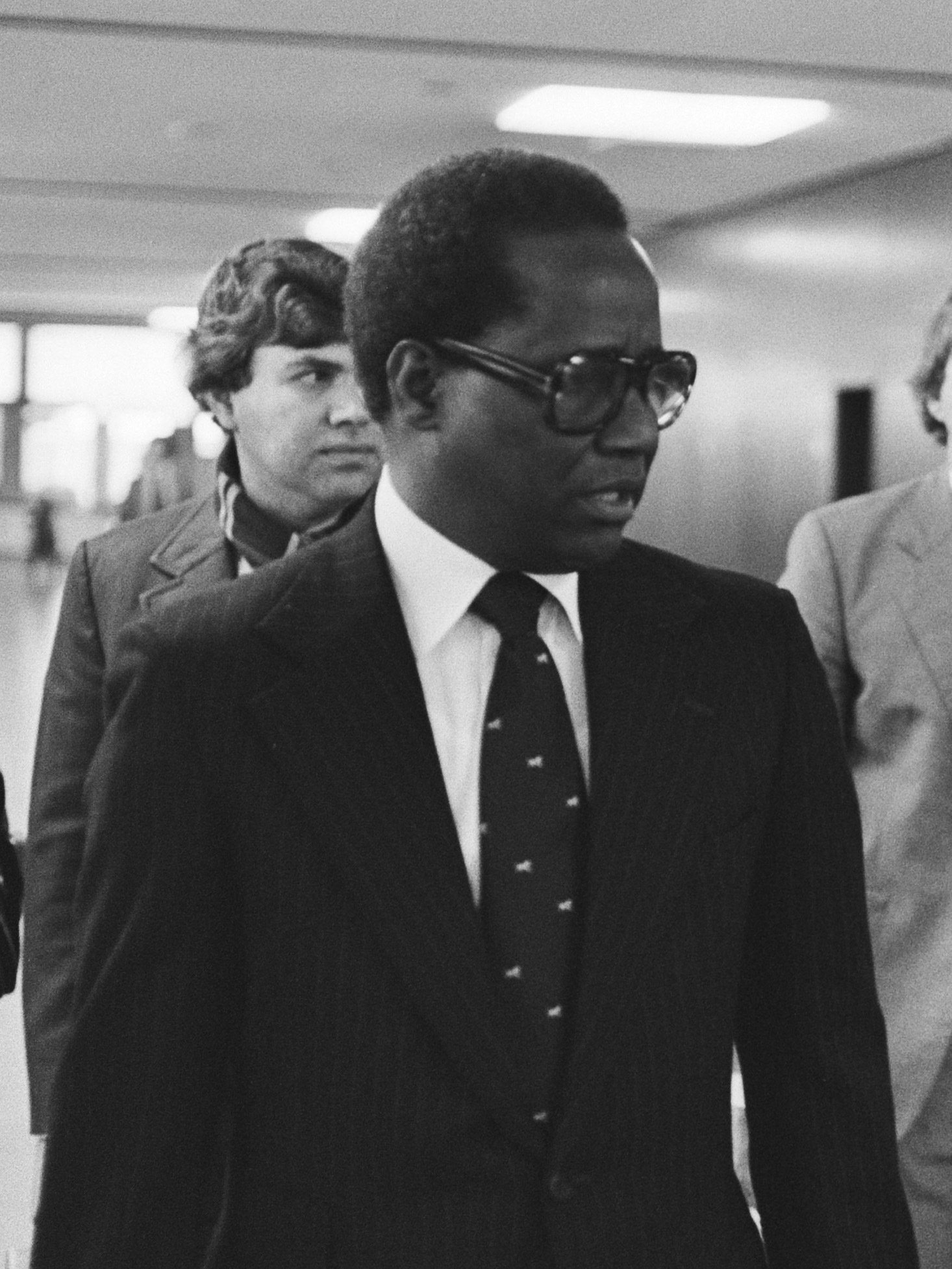
- Ahmadu in Amsterdam, 1979

Ambassador of Nigeria to the Soviet Union
- In office 1975–1978

Ambassador of Nigeria to East Germany
- In office 1975–1978

Ambassador of Nigeria to the Netherlands
- In office 1978–1981

Ambassador of Nigeria to Cameroon
- In office 1982–1984

High Commissioner of Nigeria to the Bahamas
- In office 1987–1990

Ambassador of Nigeria to the United States
- In office 1987–1991

Personal details
- Born: 1924 Sokoto, Nigeria
- Died: May 1, 2016 (aged 92) Lagos, Nigeria
- Occupation: Diplomat; civil servant

Hamzat Ahmadu (1924 – May 1, 2016) was a Nigerian diplomat and civil servant. He served as Ambassador to the Soviet Union (1975–1978), East Germany (1975–1978), the Netherlands (1978–1981), Cameroon (1982–1984), and the United States (1987–1991) at various times during his diplomatic career. He also served as the High Commissioner to the Bahamas from 1987 to 1990.

== Biography ==
Hamzat Ahmadu was born in 1924 in Sokoto (now Sokoto State), northern Nigeria.

Ahmadu spoke fluent Arabic and English, as well as conversational French and German. A native of present-day Sokoto State, Ahamadu began his career during the British colonial era as an employee of the Nigerian Secretariat, the Kaduna Provincial Office, Kano and Lugard Hall, and the Northern Nigerian Legislature in Kaduna. He then studied at universities in the United Kingdom until 1958.

In 1958, Ahmadu returned to British Nigeria and rejoined the Colonial Administrative Service. He was hired as the Private Secretary to the Premier of Northern Nigerian Foreign Service.

In addition to his diplomatic positions as an ambassador, Ahmadu held a number of high ranking positions within the country's Diplomatic Service, from which he devised and managed Nigeria's foreign policy. His positions within the Foreign Ministry and Diplomatic Service included Director of Africa, Consular and Treaties Division (1964-1966), Director of the Asia Division (1965-1966), Director-General of Protocol (1981-1982), and Director-General of African Affairs (1984-1985). He was then appointed Permanent Secretary and Head of the Diplomatic Service from 1986 to 1987.

Hamzat Ahmadu was jointly accredited as the Ambassador to the Soviet Union and East Germany from 1975 to 1978. He then served as Ambassador to the Netherlands from 1978 to 1981 and Ambassador to neighboring Cameroon from 1982 to 1984. He also held diplomatic positions in Bonn, West Germany, and London. On July 20, 1987, Ahmadu was appointed Ambassador Extraordinary & Plenipotentiary to the United States of America, a post he held from 1987 until approximately 1991. He also served as Nigeria's High Commissioner to the Commonwealth of the Bahamas.

Ahmadu later worked as a consultant to The Guardian newspaper's editorial board until his death in 2016.

== Personal life and death ==
Ahmadu held the traditional title of Walin Sokoto and was active in civic affairs after retirement.

Ahmadu died on May 1, 2016, at a private hospital in Lagos, Nigeria. He was survived by his wife and children. His funeral and funeral prayers were held at the Sultan's Palace in Sokoto.
