= Aleksandras Ambrazevičius =

Lithuanian politician

Aleksandras Ambrazevičius (born 15 October 1953) is a Lithuanian politician, born in Olyokminsk, Yakut ASSR. In 1990 he was among those who signed the Act of the Re-Establishment of the State of Lithuania.
