= Aleksandras Dičpetris =

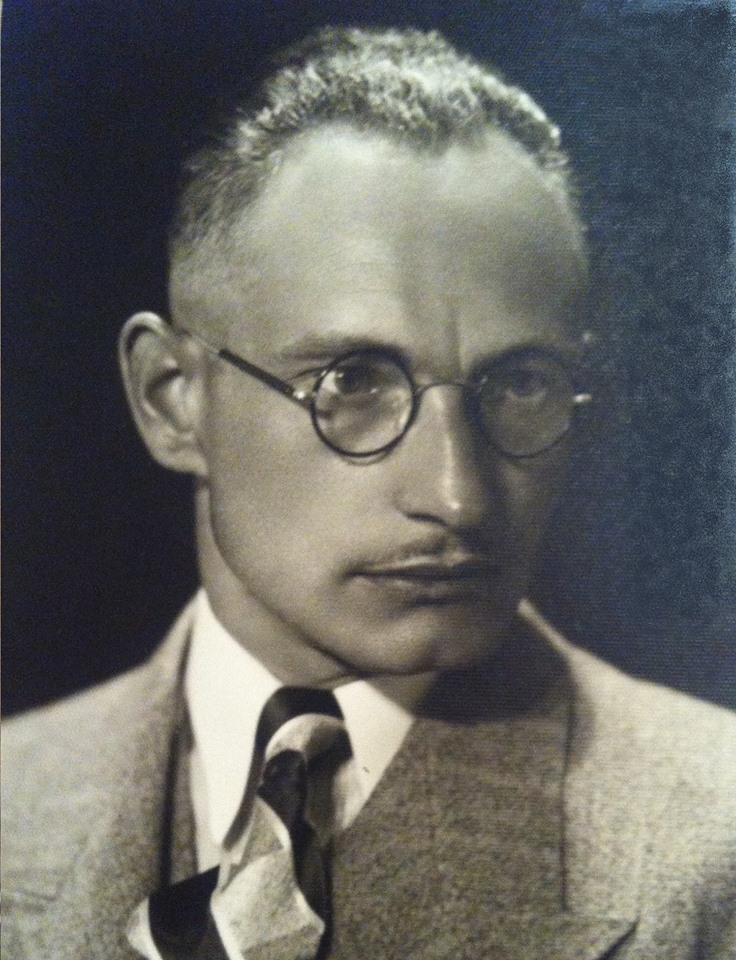
Aleksandras Dičpetris

Aleksandras Dičpetris (31 October 1906 – 30 November 1968) was a Lithuanian poet and educator. He first published poetry in 1923 and continued publishing in college. He majored in German studies and Lithuanian philology and pedagogy at Vytautas Magnus University, belonged to the “tent society” and graduated in 1933. The melodic quatrain collection Dalia Necklace published in 1930 alternates between symbolist and neoromantic styles. In 1931 his poem entitled Lithuania Our Motherland drew notable attention.

He became a headmaster of a college preparatory school. When the Soviet Union invaded Lithuania in 1939 his high standing in the community meant he had to leave the country in order to secure the safety of his family. He chose to move to Germany and established another school for Lithuanian expatriates in Germany where he again became the headmaster. In 1944 he chose an offer of resettlement in Scotland for him, his wife and four children.

He died in Bradford 1968 and is buried in London. His son Aleksandras Napoleonas Dičpetris also became a writer and author of works, including the allegorical travel tale novel Trys Dienos Pasauly and his daughter Rasa married Ray Davies of The Kinks and recorded with them as a backup vocalist. Additionally, his son Dr. Henrikas-P. Dicpetris is a doctor and has published a medical book.
