= Charles Quaker-Dokubo =

Nigerian academic (1952–2022)

Charles Quaker Dokubo

Presidential Amnesty Program (PAP)
- In office 2018–2020
- Preceded by: Brig.-Gen. Paul Boroh (rtd)

Director of Research and Studies, Nigerian Institute of International Affairs

Personal details
- Born: March 23, 1952 Abonnema
- Died: August 25, 2022 (aged 70) Abuja
- Education: Huddersfield Technical College; Teesside University; University of Bradford
- Occupation: Research Professor

Charles Quaker Dokubo was a Nigerian academic and former Special Adviser to the President on Niger Delta and Coordinator of the Presidential Amnesty Programme (PAP).

== Early life and education ==
Charles Quaker Dokubo was born on March 23, 1952, in Abonnema, Akuku Toru Local Government, Rivers State.

All of his elementary and secondary schooling took place in Abonnema before travelling to the UK and attending Huddersfield Technical College in West Yorkshire to complete his "A" levels.

After receiving a Bachelor of Arts in modern history and politics from the University of Teesside in Middlesbrough, Dokubo went on to earn a master's degree in peace studies and PhD in Nuclear Weapon Proliferation and its control from the University of Bradford in 1985.

== Career ==
Dokubo was a Research Professor at the Nigerian Institute of International Affairs in Lagos, Nigeria before he was appointed Coordinator of the Presidential Amnesty Programme (PAP) in 2018.

He was in charge of voter registration during the 1997 special elections in Liberia as a member of the Economic Community of West African State's technical support team.

In 2020, President Muhammadu Buhari approved his suspension after alleged misappropriation of resources.
