= Buros Center for Testing =

US nonprofit organization

- Parent institution: University of Nebraska–Lincoln
- Founder: Oscar Krisen Buros
- Established: 1938; 88 years ago
- Mission: Improve the science and practice of testing and assessment
- Formerly called: Buros Institute of Mental Measurement
- Address: 21 Teachers College Hall
- Location: Lincoln, Nebraska
- Website: buros.org

The Buros Center for Testing (formerly the Buros Institute of Mental Measurement) is an independent, non-profit organization within the Department of Educational Psychology at the University of Nebraska–Lincoln that provides critical reviews of published tests in clinical and educational psychology. It is recognized as a world leader in the review of published tests. Following founder Oscar Krisen Buros's death in 1978, his widow Luella Buros moved the center to its current location and expanded Buros' original focus by including coverage of Spanish tests, providing test reviews through academic databases and online download, and more generally advancing the quality of testing. The center maintains a public library of tests published after 1929 and also provides consultation and training related to testing.

The Buros Center comprises three distinct units that provide unique products and services for the testing and assessment community. The Test Reviews and Information unit publishes three reference volume series — Mental Measurements Yearbook, Tests in Print, and Pruebas Publicadas en Español: An Index of Spanish Tests in Print — that appraise commercially available tests. The Psychometric Consulting unit offers consultation services that assist proprietary testing programs in improving the quality of their programs and validity of results. The Psychometric Consulting unit also offers auditing and accreditation services for licensure and certification tests. The Assessment Literacy unit develops programming and collaborative research to deepen understanding of testing and assessment practices.

== History ==
Oscar Krisen Buros (1905–1978) was a professor of measurement and statistics in the Rutgers Graduate School of Education when he published a comprehensive review of psychological tests in 1938, the Mental Measurements Yearbook (MMY). It has been updated regularly since, with the twenty-first edition published in 2021. In a Time profile in 1939, Buros explained he relied on outside experts to provide reviews, using 133 reviewers in the first edition of the MMY, and 245 in the second. His motivation for the project was a belief that nine out of ten published tests were unreliable, and his work sometimes led lawsuit threats from test publishers. Toward the end of Buros's career, he suggested that about half of published tests were worthy of publication.

Oscar and his wife Luella published eight MMYs over forty years, and also began publishing a cumulative reference book, Tests in Print, in 1961, and a series of monographs on specialized tests. The MMY has been updated regularly since 1938. Upon his death, the Buros Institute of Mental Measurement moved to the University of Nebraska–Lincoln, where it has remained. It was renamed the Buros Center for Testing in 1994.

== Products and services ==
The center's reviews provide detailed information and critical test appraisal, written by independent reviewers with a doctoral-level education in psychometrics. The reviews are available in three publications.

=== Mental Measurements Yearbook ===
A series of reference books that provide periodic updates covering English language tests that have been published or changed since the prior edition. The first edition was published in 1938 and the most recent, the twenty-first, was published in 2021.

=== Tests in Print ===
Tests in Print (TIP) is a bibliography of all known commercially available tests currently in print in English. The first volume was published in 1961 and the most recent in 2016.

Many tests listed in TIP are cross-referenced to reviews of tests in the Mental Measurements Yearbook. Tests in Print is a cumulative series – unless a test is out of print or the publisher has chosen not to share test materials for description-writing purposes, listings will be included in each subsequent volume and updated as-needed.

=== Pruebas Publicadas en Español: An Index of Spanish Tests in Print ===
Pruebas Publicadas en Español: An Index of Spanish Tests in Print ('PPE) is a bilingual reference volume to locate information about commercially available tests in Spanish. The first volume was published in 2013. The second edition, which included descriptions of more than 600 tests, was published in 2018. PPE serves as a Spanish-language version of Tests in Print. Test descriptions are provided side-by-side in Spanish and English and include information about population, purpose, country and language of origin, norms, translation/adaptation process, scores, and which components are in Spanish.

Entries in Pruebas Publicadas en Español (PPE) offer descriptions of a wide range of Spanish-language assessments, including those developed entirely in Spanish, those containing only one or two Spanish forms and those providing Spanish administration instructions. Tests come from publishers around the world, including Spain, Mexico, Argentina, Chile, Puerto Rico, the United States, Israel, and the United Kingdom.

=== Test Reviews Online ===
An online service at the center's website provides brief information on over 4,000 published tests and offers full reviews for purchase and immediate download.

=== Academic databases ===
The center's test reviews are available from EBSCO Information Services and Ovid Technologies, databases that can be found at many academic libraries.

== Consultation and training ==
The Buros Center provides consultation in psychometrics and data analysis. It provides webinars and periodic conferences that can be used for professional continuing education credits. It also publishes professional standards, codes, and guidelines for professional test users.

== Library of Mental Measurements ==
The center houses the Oscar K. Buros Library of Mental Measurements, a nearly complete collection of all English language tests published since 1930 available for public use.
