= International Journal of Comparative Sociology =

- Discipline: Comparative sociology
- Language: English
- Edited by: Phillip A. Hough, Florida Atlantic University, Boca Raton, FL USA

Publication details
- History: 1960–present
- Publisher: SAGE Publications
- Frequency: Bimonthly
- Impact factor: 2.156 (2021)

Standard abbreviations
- ISO 4: Int. J. Comp. Sociol.

Indexing
- ISSN: 0020-7152 (print); 1745-2554 (web)

Links
- Journal homepage; Online archive; Online access

The International Journal of Comparative Sociology is a bimonthly peer-reviewed academic journal covering the field of comparative sociology. The editors is Phillip A. Hough (Florida Atlantic University). It was established by Brill Publishers in 1960 and was acquired by SAGE Publications in 2001.

== Abstracting and indexing ==
The journal is abstracted and indexed in, among other databases: Scopus and the Social Sciences Citation Index. According to the Journal Citation Reports, the journal has a 2021 impact factor of 2.156.
