= Ken Pease =

British forensic psychologist and criminologist

Kenneth George Pease OBE (born 5 August 1943) is a British forensic psychologist and criminologist. He is a visiting professor at the Jill Dando Institute of Crime Science at University College London, a visiting professor at the University of Loughborough and an honorary visiting fellow at the Cathie Marsh Centre for Census and Survey Research at the University of Manchester. Previous positions he has held include Head of School of Sociology and Social Policy at the Ulster Polytechnic from 1981 to 1983, professor of criminology at the University of Huddersfield (where he founded the Applied Criminology Group in 1995), the University of Manchester (where he was appointed to a professorial chair in 1990), the head of the Home Office's Policing and Reducing Crime Unit from 1999 to 2000, advisor to the Home Office Crime Reduction Programme from 2000 to 2003, associate professor at the University of Saskatchewan and consultant criminologist at the Correctional Service of Canada, working in the maximum security Regional Psychiatric Centre (Prairies), Saskatoon. He has been described as a "leading British criminologist" by Zoe McKnight of Maclean's.

== Personal life ==
Pease is married to Judith Anne "Judy" Parker, with whom he has two children – Nicholas John and Catherine Sally.

== Honors and awards ==
Ken became a fellow of the British Psychological Society in 1980. In 1997, Pease was named an Officer of the Order of the British Empire (OBE) for "services to crime prevention". In 2013, Pease received a Lifetime Achievement Award from the Environmental Criminology Association. In 2014, he received a commendation from the Chief Constable of the West Yorkshire Police in recognition of his work on their Operation Optimal. A festschrift, titled Imagination for crime prevention: essays in honour of Ken Pease was published in the Crime Prevention Studies journal in 2007.

== Works ==
Books

Self Selection Policing (2016) London: Routledge, (with Jason Roach)

Evolutionary Psychology and Terrorism (2015). London: Routledge (edited with Max Taylor and Jason Roach.

Using Modelling to Predict and Prevent Victimisation. (2014) New York: Springer (with Andromachi Tseloni)

Secure Foundations: Key Issues in Crime Prevention, Crime Reduction and Community Safety. (2000 ed). London: IPPR. (with S.Ballintyne and V.McLaren)

Repeat Victimisation: An Overview. (1999 ed) Guilderland NY: Harrow and Heston (with Graham Farrell)

Uses of Criminal Statistics (1999 ed) Aldershot: Avebury.

Criminal Justice Systems of Europe and North America (1990) Helsinki: HEUNI. (Edited with K. Huukila).

Sentencing Reform: Guidance or Guidelines? (1986) Manchester: Manchester University Press (pp201). (Edited with M.Wasik).

The Psychology of Judicial Sentencing. (1986) Manchester: University of Manchester Press (pp171). (with C.T.Fitzmaurice).

Crime and Punishment: Interpreting the Data. (1986) Milton Keynes: Open University Press (pp188). (with A.K.Bottomley).

Police Work. (1986) London: Methuen. (with P.B.Ainsworth).

Community Service by Order. (1980) Edinburgh: Scottish Academic Press (pp149). (with W.W.McWilliams).

Communication with and Without Words. (1974) Manchester: Vernon Scott.
