= Social Science Quarterly =

- Discipline: Political Science
- Language: English
- Edited by: Keith Gaddie, Kirby Goidel, Kim Gaddie

Publication details
- History: 1919-present
- Publisher: Wiley-Blackwell on behalf of the Southwestern Social Science Association (United States)
- Frequency: Quarterly
- Impact factor: 1.924 (2022)

Standard abbreviations
- ISO 4: Soc. Sci. Q.

Indexing
- ISSN: 0038-4941 (print); 1540-6237 (web)
- JSTOR: 00384941

Links
- Journal homepage; Online access; Online archive

Social Science Quarterly is a quarterly peer-reviewed academic journal published by Wiley-Blackwell on behalf of the Southwestern Social Science Association. The journal covers political science, sociology, economics, history, social work, geography, international studies, and women's studies. The editors-in-chief are Keith Gaddie (University of Oklahoma), Kirby Goidel (Texas A&M University), and Kim Gaddie (University of Oklahoma)

According to the Journal Citation Reports, the journal has a 2022 impact factor of 1.924.
