= British Journal of Educational Studies =

- Discipline: Education
- Language: English
- Edited by: Gary McCulloch

Publication details
- History: 1952–present
- Publisher: Taylor & Francis on behalf of the Society for Educational Studies (United Kingdom)
- Frequency: Bimonthly
- Impact factor: 2.298 (2018)

Standard abbreviations
- ISO 4: Br. J. Educ. Stud.

Indexing
- ISSN: 0007-1005 (print); 1467-8527 (web)
- OCLC no.: 664566433

Links
- Journal homepage; Online access; Online archive

British Journal of Educational Studies is a peer-reviewed academic journal of educational studies established in 1952. The journal is published by Taylor & Francis on behalf of the Society for Educational Studies. The editor-in-chief is Gary McCulloch (UCL Institute of Education).

== Abstracting and indexing ==
The journal is indexed and abstracted in:

- America: History & Life
- Australian Research Council's Ranked Journal List
- British Education Index
- Contents Pages in Education
- Current Contents
- Education Index/Abstracts
- Educational Administration Abstracts
- Educational Research Abstracts Online
- European Reference Index for the Humanities
- Education Resources Information Center
- Family Index
- International Bibliography of Book Reviews of Scholarly Literature in the Humanities and Social Sciences
- International Bibliography of the Social Sciences
- Linguistics & Language Behavior Abstracts
- Multicultural Education Abstracts
- Research into Higher Education Abstracts
- SCOPUS
- Social Sciences Citation Index
- Social Services Abstracts
- Sociological Abstracts

In 2018, the journal had an impact factor of 2.298, ranking it 48th out of 243 journals in the category "Education & Educational Research".
