= Peace and Conflict =

- Discipline: Psychology
- Language: English
- Edited by: Laura K. Taylor, PhD

Publication details
- History: 1995–present
- Publisher: American Psychological Association (US)
- Frequency: Quarterly

Standard abbreviations
- ISO 4: Peace Confl.

Indexing
- ISSN: 1078-1919 (print); 1532-7949 (web)

Links
- Journal homepage; Online access

Peace and Conflict: Journal of Peace Psychology is a peer-reviewed academic journal published by Division 48 of the American Psychological Association. The journal was established in 1995. It is the main academic journal in the field of peace psychology, and covers research on "peace, conflict, and their interaction at all levels of analysis, from interpersonal to community, regional, national, and international issues." The current editor-in-chief is Laura K. Taylor, PhD.
