= Australian Journal of Education =

- Discipline: Education
- Language: English
- Edited by: Kylie Hillman

Publication details
- History: 1957–present
- Publisher: SAGE Publications (Australia)
- Frequency: Triannual
- Impact factor: 2.257 (2021)

Standard abbreviations
- ISO 4: Aust. J. Educ.

Indexing
- ISSN: 0004-9441 (print); 2050-5884 (web)
- LCCN: 68126449
- OCLC no.: 60627123

Links
- Journal homepage; Online access; Online archive

The Australian Journal of Education is a peer-reviewed academic journal that publishes papers in the field of education. The journal's editor is Kylie Hillman. It has been in publication since 1957 and is currently published by SAGE Publications in association with Australian Council for Educational Research.

== Scope ==
The Australian Journal of Education is an international peer-reviewed journal publishing research conducted in Australia and internationally to inform educational researchers, as well as educators, administrators and policy-makers, about issues of contemporary concern in education.

== Abstracting and indexing ==
Australian Journal of Education is abstracted and indexed in, among other databases: Australian Education Index, Scopus, and the Social Sciences Citation Index. According to the Journal Citation Reports, its 2012 impact factor is 0.351, ranking it 172 out of 216 journals in the category "Education & Educational Research".
