= Mental Measurements Yearbook =

Reference book series of educational tests

The Mental Measurements Yearbook (MMY) is a reference book series containing information and critical appraisals of English-language educational and psychological tests. The book's purpose is to provide a forum for the review of new tests and to allow consumers to identify the most appropriate test for their needs. The first edition, edited by Oscar Krisen Buros, was published in 1938 by the Rutgers University Press in New Brunswick, NJ, USA. Despite the book's title, and the original desire to publish it annually, new editions of the book are generally published every three years. In 2021, the 21st edition of the book was published by the Buros Center for Testing and is distributed by the University of Nebraska Press.

In order for a test to be included in the latest edition of the MMY, it needs to be commercially available and to have been developed or substantially revised since the last edition was published. The publisher of the test also must provide adequate documentation describing the test's development and supporting the technical properties of the test. Each test published in the MMY is reviewed by at least one qualified doctoral-level professional. Most tests are reviewed by two reviewers. Reviews contain a description of the test, technical information, as well as information on the test's development and commentary on its strengths and weaknesses.

An online database containing information and all reviews of the more than 14,000 tests covered since the first edition is offered via electronic subscription from EBSCO Information Services and Ovid Technologies.
