= Department of Peace Studies, University of Bradford =

Academic department at the University of Bradford

Department of Peace Studies and International Development, University of Bradford
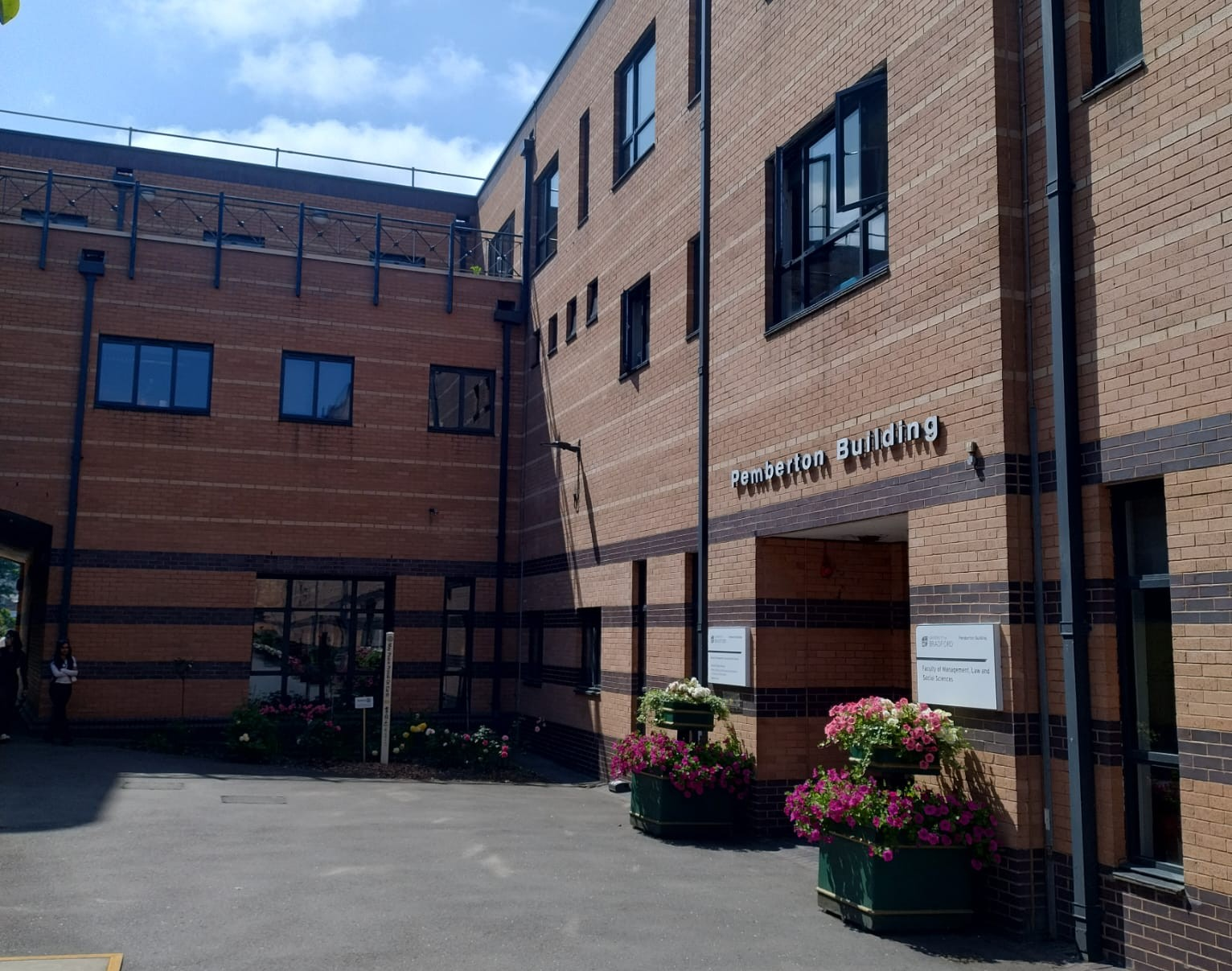
- Pemberton Building, University of Bradford
- Established: 1973; 53 years ago
- Founders: Ted Edwards, Robert McKinlay, and the Quaker Peace Studies Trust and First Chair Adam Curle
- Parent institution: University of Bradford
- Head of Department: Dr Rhys Kelly
- Academic staff: 19
- Location: Bradford, West Yorkshire, England
- Website: www.bradford.ac.uk/postgraduate/taught-degrees/subjects/peace-studies/

The Department of Peace Studies and International Development is an academic department of the University of Bradford in Bradford, United Kingdom. Founded in 1973 as the Department of Peace Studies, it was the first peace studies department established at a British university. Since its establishment, the department has conducted teaching and research in peace and conflict studies, international relations, security studies, conflict resolution, peace processes, and international development.

== History ==
The origins of the Department can be traced to the 1960s, when the Society of Friends (Quakers), whose pacifist tradition dates to the English Civil War, decided to raise funds “to establish the study of peace and conflict resolution in British universities”. The proposal was taken forward at the University of Bradford in the early 1970s, when the Society of Friends and the University agreed that each would raise £75,000 towards the cost of establishing a Chair in Peace Studies. The Quaker Peace Studies Trust was established in 1971 to organise a public appeal for funds, and the £150,000 target was reached within ten weeks of the appeal's launch in March 1972. The appeal attracted widespread public support and coverage in national news media, including BBC headline news bulletins. Statements of support were also received from figures in the fields of art, literature, religion and politics, including UK Prime Minister Harold Wilson, novelist J. B. Priestley, UN Secretary-General U Thant, US pacifist and folk singer Joan Baez, and composer Benjamin Britten. Curle's move to Bradford followed a sabbatical at the Richardson Institute in London during 1969–70, during which he wrote Making Peace. The book influenced the early development of the Department. His inaugural lecture, The Scope and Dilemmas of Peace Studies, was delivered in 1975. In 1985, it was republished alongside the inaugural lecture of the second professor, James O'Connell, under the title Peace with Work to Do.

== Research centres and affiliated organisations ==
=== Quaker Peace Studies Trust (QPST) ===
The Department has maintained a relationship with the Quaker Peace Studies Trust (QPST), which is the charity formed in 1972 for the establishment of the UK's first Chair in Peace Studies and formation of the Department in 1973. Since that time, QPST has been involved in the support of research, teaching, and learning of peace, and involvement in research projects, visits, internships, student activities, and learning opportunities. Through this long-term relationship, QPST continues to contribute to the activities of the Department.

In 2010, the trust donated the Archive consisting mainly of minutes, reports, papers and correspondence. There are some photographs, plus articles and papers on the history of Peace Studies and of QPST. The Archive has been fully catalogued by the Project Archivist Helen Roberts.

=== Rotary Peace Centre ===
The Department also houses the Rotary Peace Centre of the University of Bradford, one of the eight Rotary Peace Centres globally. Since 2002, the Rotary Peace Centre has been offering the fellowship programme to fellows who hail from various countries. The fellowship programme emphasizes on peacebuilding, conflict resolution, and international development. The fellowship programme is a combination of academic, field experience, and professional training. The fellows are integrated into a global network of Rotary Peace Fellows, who work in fields of peacebuilding, conflict resolution and sustainable development.

=== The John and Elnora Ferguson Centre for African Studies (JEFCAS) ===
The John and Elnora Ferguson Centre for African Studies (JEFCAS) has been based in the Department of Peace Studies and International Development at the University of Bradford since 2002 and has been funded through an endowment from the Allan & Nesta Ferguson Trust since 2005. Its mission is to support academic and applied research, teaching and knowledge transfer relating to Africa within the University.

JEFCAS also supports research by providing seed funding for University of Bradford academics to develop research projects. In addition, it provides financial support for the Africa Study Visit for master's and third-year undergraduate students. The module includes a two-week visit to a post-conflict or post-crisis African country and incorporates field-based research relating to peace-building and post-conflict reconstruction in Africa. Students undertake primary research during the visit and are assessed on how they apply their findings in their academic work. The module is intended to provide experience of field research and research methods that may be relevant to further academic study or research-related employment. Previous destinations have included Liberia, Sierra Leone, Ethiopia, The Gambia, Tunisia and Rwanda.

=== International Network of Museums for Peace ===
The International Network of Museums for Peace (INMP) is one of the major international organisations working in the field of bringing together museums, monuments, peace sites and educational establishments working for the promotion of peace, non-violence and reconciliation for more than three decades. Founded in 1992 at the University of Bradford during the first international conference of peace and anti-war museums, the INMP serves as a platform for bringing practitioners and scholars from all over the world who strive to promote peace education and international cooperation for developing new museums of peace.

== Tolstoy Cup ==
The Tolstoy Cup is an annual football match played between the students of the Department of Peace Studies at the University of Bradford and the Department of War Studies at King's College London since 1995. The rivalry between 'Peace Studies' and 'War Studies' was featured on the Financial Times list of "Great college sports rivalries". The competition is named after War and Peace, the 1869 novel written by the Russian author Leo Tolstoy. The "trophy" is a framed copy of the book. It is kept by the department of the current winners. Since 2024, no further games have occurred, with the trophy held by the most recent winner - University of Bradford.

== Alumni ==
=== Politics, diplomacy and public service ===
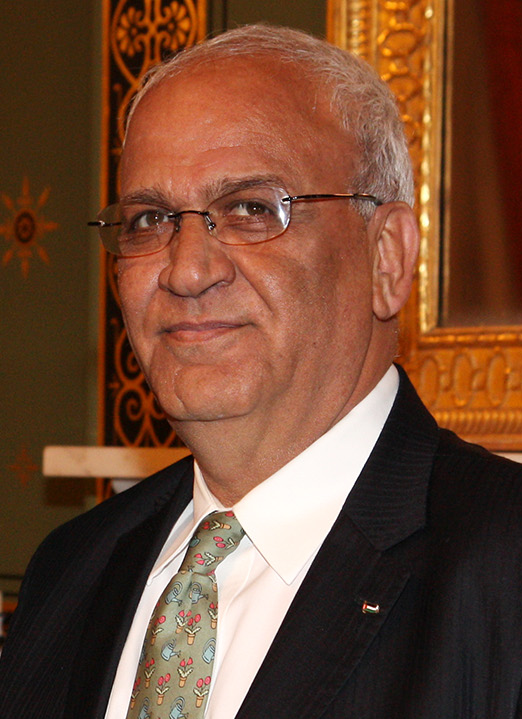
Saeb Erekat, former Secretary General of the Executive Committee of the Palestine Liberation Organization.

- Raja Juli Antoni (MA 2004), Indonesian politician and government minister.
- Julius Maada Bio (PhD 2016), 5th President of Sierra Leone
- Chakufwa Chihana (MA 1984), former Second Vice-President of Malawi.
- Saeb Erekat (PhD 1983), Chief Palestinian negotiator and former Secretary-General of the PLO.
- Lloyd Russell-Moyle (BA 2012), former Labour Member of Parliament.

=== Peace, Security & International Affairs ===
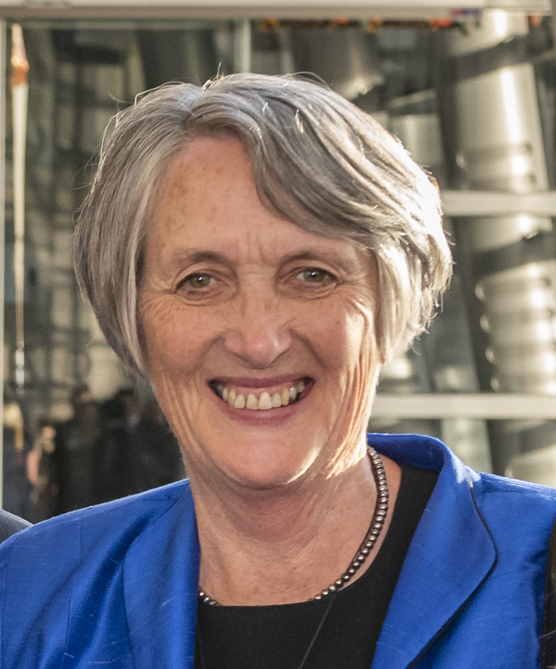
Kate Dewes, New Zealand activist for disarmament and former advisor on peace matters to two United Nations Secretaries-General.

- Kate Dewes (MA), New Zealand peace researcher and disarmament advocate.
- Scilla Elworthy (PhD 1993), peace researcher, author and founder of Oxford Research Group and Peace Direct.
- Mahdi Abdul Hadi (PhD 1981), Palestinian academic and founder of PASSIA.
- Charles Quaker-Dokubo (PhD 1985), Nigerian academic and former Special Adviser on Amnesty Programme to the President of Nigeria.

=== Academia & Research ===
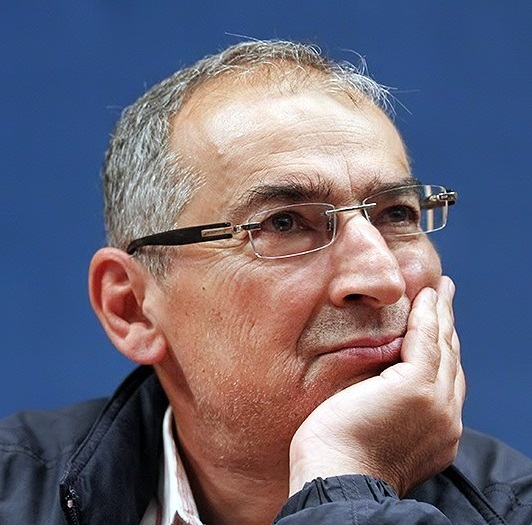
Sadegh Zibakalam, Iranian academic, author and pundit

- Matthew Hassan Kukah (MD, 1980), Nigerian academic, public intellectual and Catholic bishop.
- Sadegh Zibakalam (PhD 1989), Iranian political scientist, author and commentator.

=== Activism & Civil Society ===
- Kazuko Asai (MA 2000), Japanese peace activist.
- Sylvia Aguilera García (MA), Mexican peace activist and human rights advocate.
- Lindis Percy (MA), British peace activist.
- Michael Randle (MPhil 1981; PhD 1994), English peace campaigner and researcher.
- Takashi Satani (MA 2004), Japanese peacebuilding practitioner.
- Rumiko Seya (MA), Japanese peace researcher and activist.
