= Joseph Conrad's career at sea =

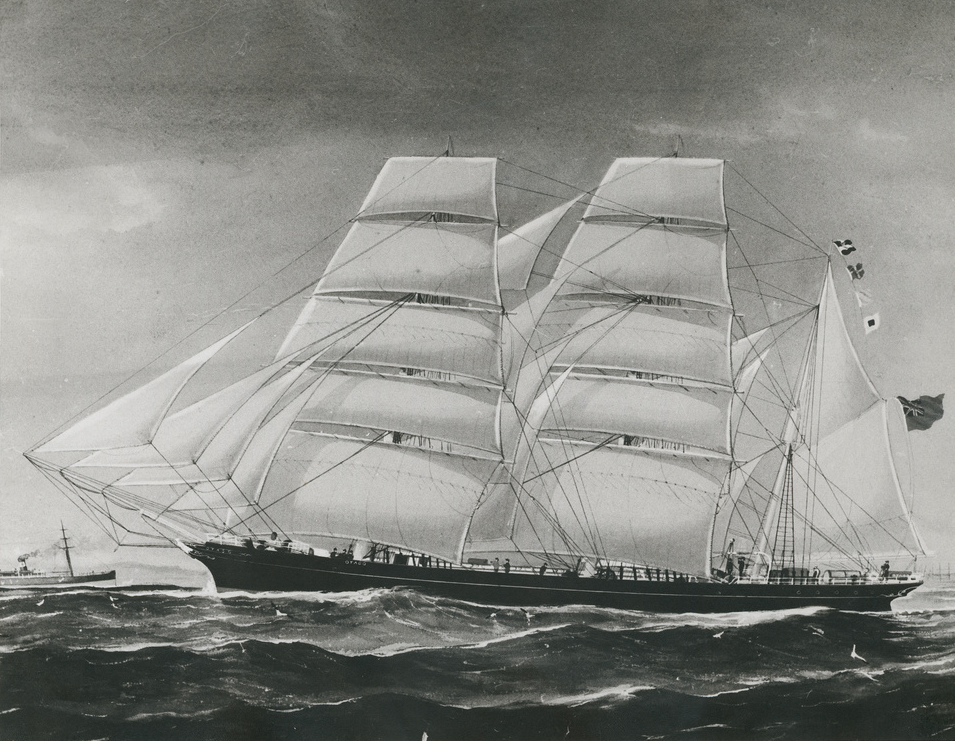
The barque Otago, captained by Conrad in 1888 and early 1889.

Joseph Conrad (born Józef Teodor Konrad Korzeniowski; Berdychiv, Ukraine, 3 December 1857 – 3 August 1924, Bishopsbourne, Kent, England) was a Polish author who wrote in English after settling in England. (Note: In a 14 February 1901 letter to his namesake Józef Korzeniowski, a librarian at Kraków's Jagiellonian University, Conrad wrote, partly in reference to some Poles' accusation that he had deserted the Polish cause by writing in English: "It is widely known that I am a Pole and that Józef Konrad are my [given] names, the latter being used by me as a surname so that foreign mouths should not distort my real surname—a distortion which I cannot stand. It does not seem to me that I have been unfaithful to my country by having proved to the English that a gentleman from the Ukraine can be as good a sailor as they, and has something to tell them in their own language.") He is regarded as one of the greatest writers in English, though he did not speak the language fluently until he was in his twenties, and always with a marked Polish accent.

Before embarking on writing, he had a career sailing in the French, then the British, merchant marine. Of his 19-year merchant-marine career, about half that time was spent actually at sea.

Conrad wrote stories and novels, often with a nautical setting, that depict trials of the human spirit in the midst of an impassive, inscrutable universe. (Note: Conrad wrote: "In this world—as I have known it—we are made to suffer without the shadow of a reason, of a cause or of guilt. [...] There is no morality, no knowledge and no hope; there is only the consciousness of ourselves which drives us about a world that [...] is always but a vain and fleeting appearance.") He was a master prose stylist who brought a distinctly non-English tragic sensibility into English literature. (Note: Rudyard Kipling felt that "with a pen in his hand he was first amongst us" but that there was nothing English in Conrad's mentality: "When I am reading him, I always have the impression that I am reading an excellent translation of a foreign author." Cf. Zdzisław Najder's similar observation: "He was... an English writer who grew up in other linguistic and cultural environments. His work can be seen as located in the borderland of auto-translation [emphasis added].")

Conrad is viewed as a precursor of modernist literature. His narrative style and anti-heroic characters have influenced many authors up to the present. Many films have been adapted from, or inspired by, Conrad's stories and novels.

Writing in the heyday of the British Empire, Conrad drew on his Polish heritage and on his personal experiences in the French and British merchant navies, to create short stories and novels that reflect aspects of a European-dominated world, while plumbing the depths of the human soul.

== French voyages ==
Arriving in Marseille in 1874, the not quite 17-year-old Joseph Conrad was to have been looked after by a Pole who sailed in French ships, but the sailor was temporarily away and ship pilots became Conrad's first instructors in sailing. He grew to love the Mediterranean, "the cradle of sailing." Conrad, who became a professional sailor, never learned to swim.

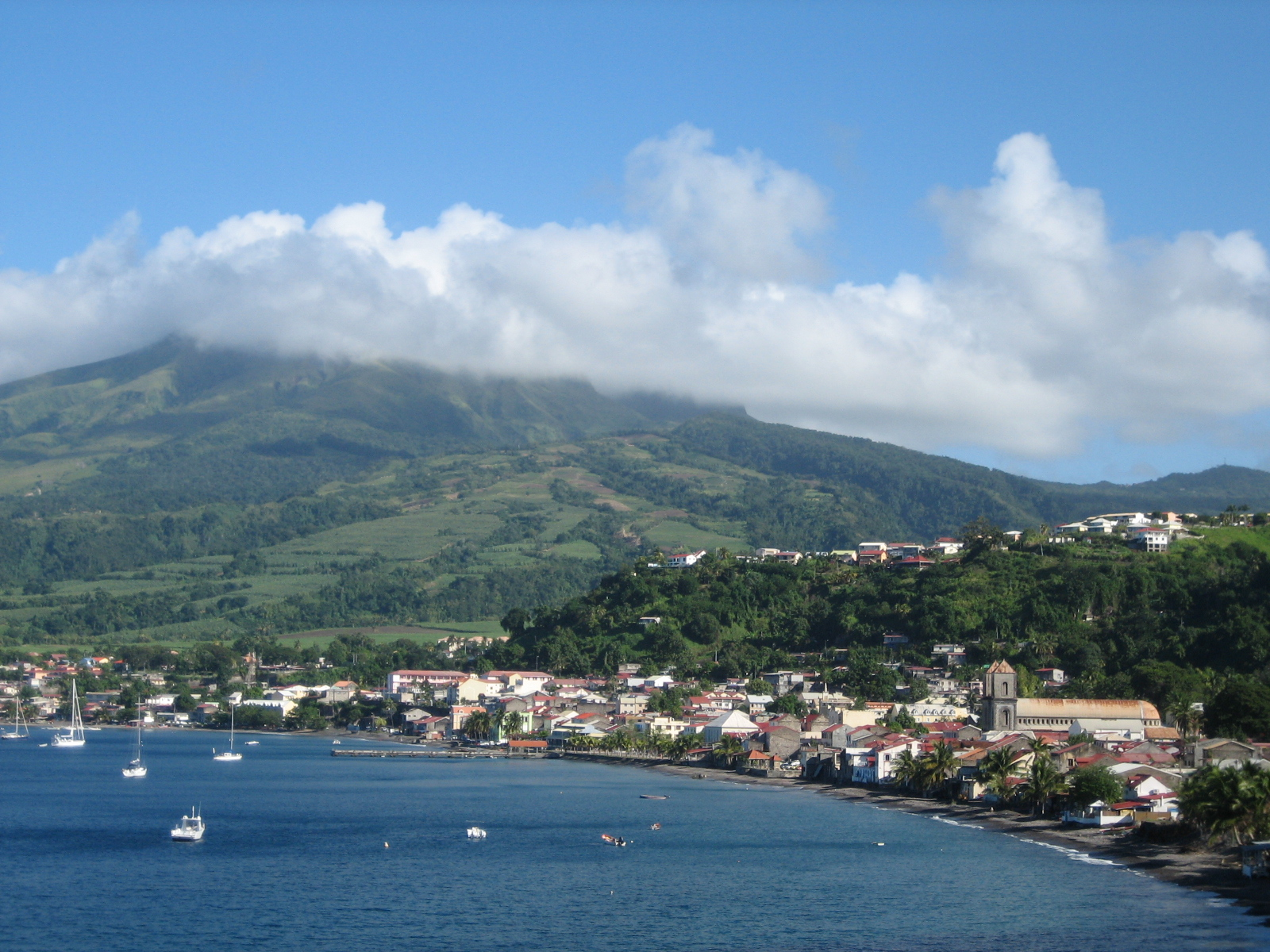
Saint-Pierre, Martinique

After two months at Marseilles, on 15 December 1874 Conrad, just turned seventeen, began his first sea voyage—as a passenger in a small barque, the Mont-Blanc, which reached Saint-Pierre, Martinique, in the Caribbean, on 6 February 1875. During the ship's return passage to Marseilles (31 March – 23 May) he may have been a crew member. His objectives for this maiden voyage were probably to promote his health and give him a closer look at sailors' work. A month later, on 25 June, he again left in the Mont-Blanc, now as an apprentice, arriving at Saint-Pierre on 31 July. After visiting several other Caribbean ports, the ship returned to France, arriving on 23 December at Le Havre.

In 1875 Conrad spent seven months at sea. This did not seem to have stirred his enthusiasm for the seaman's profession. He gave himself six months' rest from the sea, socializing and spending in excess of the generous allowance that he received from his maternal uncle, Tadeusz Bobrowski. The uncle indulged his nephew's financial demands but sent him lengthy letters of reproof that included his usual criticisms of Conrad's improvident paternal line. (Note: Bobrowski, in his letters to Conrad, repeatedly emphasized the contrast between the reasonable and responsible Bobrowskis and the Korzeniowskis, whom he characterized as dreamers and wastrels—in the process, whitewashing his own family, which did not lack its own madcaps and rogues.)

On 10 July 1876 Conrad sailed for the West Indies as a steward (at a salary of 35 francs, equivalent to one-fifth the allowance he received from his uncle) in the barque Saint-Antoine, making Saint-Pierre on 18 August. The first mate was a 42-year-old Corsican, Dominique Cervoni, who would become a prototype for the title character of Conrad's Nostromo: "In his eyes lurked a look of perfectly remorseless irony, as though he had been provided with an extremely experienced soul; and the slightest distension of his nostrils would give to his bronzed face a look of extraordinary boldness. This was the only play of feature of which he seemed capable, being a Southerner of a concentrated, deliberate type." The Saint-Antoine, after visiting Martinique, St. Thomas and Haiti, returned on 15 February 1877 to Marseilles.

In his novel The Arrow of Gold, Conrad alludes to smuggling "by sea of arms and ammunition to the Carlist detachments in the South [of Spain]." This apparently involved Dominique Cervoni. Conrad's first biographer, Georges Jean-Aubry (1882–1950), built on this allusion a tale about Cervoni and Conrad smuggling arms to a Central American republic. The pre-eminent Conrad chronicler and scholar Zdzisław Najder (born 1930) is skeptical about the story and surmises that Conrad "might have heard... stories [about gun-running] from the experienced Cervoni."

In December 1877 it transpired that, as a foreigner and Russian subject, Conrad could not serve on French ships without permission from the Russian consul. And since Conrad was liable for military service in Russia, there was no chance of obtaining the consul's consent. In consultation with his uncle, "it was decided that he should join the English Merchant Marine where there are no such formalities as in France".

Conrad later described, in his essay collection The Mirror of the Sea (1906) and his novel The Arrow of Gold (1919), having, during his stay in Marseilles, smuggled arms to Spain for the Carlist supporters of Carlos de Borbón y de Austria-Este, pretender to the Spanish throne. Najder finds this, for a variety of reasons, virtually impossible. If Conrad did participate in running contraband to Spain, it likely would have involved something other than weapons. But in the two books written three and four decades later, he embellished his memories, probably borrowing from past adventures of Marseilles friends. To admit that his illicit activities had been conducted for profit would have conflicted with the position that he wished to occupy in literature. And attempts to track down the reality behind his accounts are complicated by Conrad's habit of using some external characteristics, and often the names, of actual people but of furnishing them with different life histories (as in the cases of Almayer, Lingard, Jim, and Kurtz). Najder writes:

A careful reading of "The Tremolino" and The Arrow of Gold reveals that the whole Carlist plot is a sideline, an ornament that does not affect the course of action; its only function seems to be to glamorize and idealize smuggling. Two elements overlap in these books: the author's own recollections, modified in many respects, of the years 1877 and 1878, and his knowledge of Carlist activities and supporters in 1874 through 1876; they may prove more authentic taken separately than taken together.

Another Marseilles legend concerns Conrad's great love affair. The story is described only in The Arrow of Gold, a pseudo-autobiographical novel whose chronology is at odds with the documented dates in Conrad's life.

== British voyages ==
On 10 June 1878 Konrad Korzeniowski set foot on English soil for the first time, at Lowestoft, having arrived on the small British steamer Mavis, which he had boarded on 24 April 1878 at Marseilles. He had probably joined the ship not as a crew member but as an unofficial apprentice. It is not clear whether he had been on board during the Russian leg of its itinerary, which would have been hazardous for the Tsar's Polish subject. He still planned to return to France and enlist in the French navy. A conflict with Captain Samuel William Pipe prompted Conrad to leave the ship. He departed for London, where he quickly went through half his ready cash. Appealing to his uncle, he received additional funds, along with a long letter exhorting him to "think for yourself and fend for yourself... don't idle; learn, and don't pretend to be a rich young gentleman.... If you have not secured yourself a position by the age of 24, do not count on the allowance... I have no money for drones and I have no intention of working so that someone else may enjoy himself at my expense..."

Conrad returned to Lowestoft and on 11 July 1878 signed on to a coastal coal schooner, the Skimmer of the Sea. He won popularity with the crew by bearing the cost of entertainment and treats, not paid out of his shilling-a-month ordinary seaman's earnings (the lowest permissible) but out of his uncle's allowance, 160 times higher. "In that craft I began to learn English from East Coast chaps, each built as though to last for ever, and coloured like a Christmas card." Having made three voyages to Newcastle upon Tyne and back in the Skimmer, after only 73 days, on 23 September, Conrad left the schooner.

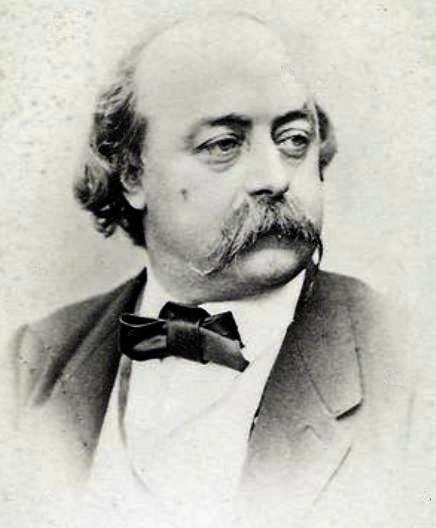
French novelist Gustave Flaubert's works would influence Conrad's own painstaking creations.

On 15 October 1878, in his first genuine service at sea, Conrad sailed in the clipper ship Duke of Sutherland on his longest voyage till then, around the Cape of Good Hope to Australia, arriving on 31 January 1879 at Sydney Harbour. He gained knowledge of local conditions and even of the slang, revealed later in his short story "To-morrow". It was then that he became acquainted with the works of Flaubert, through Salammbô, and read a one-volume edition of Shakespeare. In Sydney—Bobrowski wrote Buszczyński—Conrad met a captain famous for his knowledge of Maritime Southeast Asia. The unnamed captain may have become a partial prototype of Tom Lingard in Almayer's Folly, An Outcast of the Islands and The Rescue, whose namesake Conrad never met. The Duke of Sutherland left Sydney on 6 July 1879 on its homeward voyage, and Conrad arrived in London on 19 October.

Having evidently for the moment lost desire for long-distance voyages, on 11 December 1879 Conrad enlisted as an able-bodied seaman in the iron steamer Europa. The next day the ship departed for Genoa, Naples, Patras and Palermo, returning to London on 29 January 1880. Soon after, Conrad met George Fountaine Weare Hope, an ex-merchant-service officer, then director of a London commercial firm. This was apparently Conrad's first close contact in England and it developed into a long-lasting friendship.

Urged on by his uncle, Conrad applied to take the examination for second mate in the British Merchant Marine. Applicants were required to document at least four years' service at sea. In reality, he had served only seventeen months. But, armed with a document from Delestang that amplified his period in French service, and giving augmented figures for his British service, he signed a declaration of his statements and of the enclosed documents, risking indictment in the event that the fraud were discovered. He attended a cram course for the examination and passed it on 28 May 1880, aged 22.

=== Second mate ===
On 21 August 1880 Conrad enlisted as third mate on an iron clipper ship, the Loch Etive. The next day the ship left London, arriving in Sydney on 24 November. The return voyage began on 11 January 1881. In The Mirror of the Sea (1906) Conrad would give a story, of uncertain basis, relating to this voyage—the rescue of the crew of a Danish sailing ship. The Loch Etive arrived in London on 25 April 1881. There Conrad's allowance from his uncle awaited him: 46 pounds for six months—over twice his earnings on the Loch Etive.

While waiting to enlist for another voyage, Conrad again engaged in some kind of disastrous speculation, which cost him at least his entire half-yearly allowance. This probably gave rise to a fantastic story, with which he regaled his uncle in a letter of 10 August 1881, about an accident aboard the clipper Annie Frost (with which Conrad had no link), loss of luggage, and several days spent in hospital.

Conrad had trouble finding a berth as second mate. Eventually he signed on to a small, rickety old barque, the Palestine, for a voyage to Bangkok at pay of 4 pounds a month. From 15 October 1881 uncle Bobrowski was to send him only half the previous allowance, rounded up to 50 pounds a year—slightly over his new, highest salary to date. The Palestine was manned by three officers and ten hands and commanded by 57-year-old Captain Elijah Beard. Conrad was not too pleased with his new appointment. The Palestine left London on 21 September 1881 and, after a stop at Gravesend, sailed north on 28 September. Due to gales, the passage to Newcastle upon Tyne took 22 days.

Conrad later described his adventures on the Palestine, renamed Judea, in his short story "Youth" (1898), which he was to call "a feat of memory" and "a record of experience." Though he preserved the names of the captain and first officer, and though the general course of events and many details correspond with the facts, as usual a number of things are creations of Conrad's imagination. Thus, there is no documentary evidence of a collision with a steamship at Newcastle; the story's hero is four years younger than Conrad; there was only one attempt, not several, to leave Falmouth, Cornwall, as the ship was continuously under repair; and there are other, more striking discrepancies.

The Palestine, carrying a cargo of coal, left Newcastle for Bangkok on 29 November 1881. Crossing the English Channel, she met strong gales, lost a mast, and started to leak. On 24 December she returned to Falmouth, Cornwall, for repairs. Conrad nevertheless decided to keep his berth, probably in order to obtain the certificate of service as second officer.

Finally after nine months, on 17 September 1882, after leaving London, the Palestine sailed from Falmouth for Bangkok, Siam (Thailand). Conrad was, for the first time, fully in charge of a four-man watch—an important step forward in an officer's advancement. The ambiguous status of a novice second mate on a small barque such as the Palestine required him to be tough and strong-minded, especially in front of the sailors. The passage was slow, uneventful, monotonous, until 11 March 1883, when, in the Bangka Strait between Sumatra and Bangka Island, a smell resembling paraffin oil was noted. Next day, smoke was discovered issuing from the coals; water was thrown on them. On 13 March, four tons of coals were thrown overboard and more water poured down the hold. On 14 March, the hatches not being battened down, the decks blew up fore and aft. The vessel headed for the Sumatra shore, and the Somerset took it in tow. The fire increased rapidly, and the Somerset declined to tow the barque on shore. The vessel became a mass of fire, and the crew got off into three boats, which remained by the vessel until the morning of 15 March 1883. That evening the boats arrived at Muntok.

In his story "Youth", Conrad dramatized the accident, stretching it out in time and space and giving a different reason for parting with the towing steamer. In the story, the parting seems very risky; in reality, the disaster took place near shore. And the boats did not steer for Java, to the east of Sumatra, but toward the port of Muntok on Bangka Island, off the east coast of Sumatra. Indeed, Richard Curle's 1922 identification of Muntok as the port where the story's hero experienced his first fascinating encounter with the exotic East revealed the story's greatest exaggeration: the boats could reach shore in some dozen hours, with no need to "knock about in an open boat" for "nights and days". Conrad had also forgotten, after all those years, that he had three, not two, sailors with him in his boat. But the most interesting discrepancy between story and reality consisted in Conrad's extolling the crew as "Liverpool hard cases", whereas in fact there was not a single Liverpudlian in the crew, and half were non-Britons.

The Palestine’s Irish first officer, H. Mahon, described him to Conrad's friend George Fountaine Weare Hope as "'a capital chap,' a good Officer, the best Second Mate he had ever shipped with." Conrad officially signed off the Palestine on 3 April 1883. While he looked in vain for a job that would enable him to sail back to Europe, he explored Singapore's harbor district, which would be the scene for many of his pages. Eventually he returned to England as a passenger on a steamer, reaching London by the end of May.

The 25-year-old Conrad and his uncle Bobrowski looked forward to a repeatedly postponed meeting, to take place in Kraków; nevertheless, Bobrowski again emphasized in a letter that it was important for Conrad to obtain his British naturalization: "I should prefer to see your face a little later... as that of a free citizen of a free country, rather than earlier... as that of citizen of the world!... It is really a matter of your looking after your own best interests." In any case, the plans had to be changed due to the uncle's stomach troubles and rheumatism. They finally met—for the first time in the five years since Conrad's 1878 suicide attempt in Marseilles—in July 1883 at Marienbad in Bohemia; then on 12 August they left for Teplice, likewise in Bohemia, where Conrad stayed two more weeks. Their meeting appears to have been pleasant. Bobrowski's correspondence became more affectionate and friendly, with fewer admonitions; the prevailing mood became one of intimate understanding. Conrad's own letters from the period, to his uncle and to Stefan Buszczyński, in Najder's words, "allow... one to dispense with an occasionally advanced hypothesis that when [Konrad] left [Poland] he wanted to break once and for all with his Polish past."

On 10 September 1883 Conrad signed on as second mate on the mainly Scandinavian-crewed British clipper Riversdale. The ship sailed from London on 13 September 1883, arriving on 6 April 1884 at Madras, India. There Captain Lawrence Brown McDonald, a Scot who kept the ship's officers at a distance and treated them "as machines, to be worked by himself when and as he pleased," suffered some kind of "attack" which Conrad described to the physician whom he fetched, as alcoholic inebriation. After Captain McDonald learned, from the steamer captain who had accompanied Conrad, how Conrad had represented McDonald's condition, on 15 April 1884 McDonald dismissed Conrad, with a less than satisfactory certificate, issued on 17 April 1884. The episode seems to have subsequently inspired some of Conrad's scathing literary depictions of sea captains. (Note: Geoffrey Ursell has compared the actual episode with Conrad's fiction works. In The Mirror of the Sea Conrad wrote of a captain who "permitted no interference by his officers, nor dared they make any suggestions." In Chance Conrad drew on McDonald's testimony that he had had his wife and family on board and did not have to "cultivate the mate's acquaintance." Ursell pointed out the similarity between Conrad's description of the captain's sore and weak eyes in The End of the Tether and testimony about McDonald that had been presented at Madras. Ursell added: "The similarities between this story and the facts of the Riversdale are unquestionable.") A court of inquiry later judged McDonald responsible for the subsequent stranding of the Riversdale, which would eventually enable Conrad to take his examination for first mate (the Marine Board having initially delayed accepting his application, put off by McDonald's certificate).

Leaving the Riversdale, Conrad took a train to Bombay, where on 28 April he signed on as second mate of the clipper Narcissus, immortalized 13 years later in the title of his first sea novel, The Nigger of the 'Narcissus' (1897). The ship sailed for London on 5 June 1884. Thought to have been the original of the title Negro was Joseph Barron, aged 35, who died three weeks before the ship reached Dunkirk. Considering that Captain Archibald Duncan had had trouble with his crew only during the southbound passage—the return voyage was uneventful—Conrad seems to have incorporated into his novel the story of crew trouble heard from Duncan. The Narcissus entered Dunkirk on 16 October 1884, and next day Conrad signed off.

Having at last completed the required length of service, Conrad prepared for his first officer's examination. He failed it on 17 November 1884 (he would give no hint of this in A Personal Record, 1912) but, perhaps after coaching by a crammer, passed it on 3 December 1884—over four years after his examination for second mate.

=== First mate ===
The years 1885–88 were marked by a fall in demand for new vessels, as the tonnage of individual ships grew; berths for officers fell with the number of ships. The challenge for foreign officers was increased by Britons' resentment of the "invasion" of foreigners. "The fact that Conrad always presented his relationship with his English superiors and employers as free of national conflict is no proof," writes Najder, "since he often smoothed out and retouched his past to render it more consistently positive..."

Conrad searched nearly five months before, on 24 April 1885, in Hull, England, finding a berth as second officer aboard the clipper Tilkhurst, the largest sailing ship in which he served. On 10 June the ship, with a cargo of coal, sailed from Penarth, reaching Singapore on 22 September. The crew once again was largely Scandinavian, and, exceptionally, only one crew member left the ship there. Of the captain, Edwin John Blake, a physician's son, Conrad had the most positive recollections of all his commanders—"a singularly well-informed mind, the least sailor-like in outward aspect, but certainly one of the best seamen... it has been my good luck to serve under." The unloading in Singapore ended on 19 October. The Tilkhurst sailed to Calcutta, arriving on 21 November. After taking on a load of jute, the ship began its homeward passage on 9 January 1886.

During his stay in India, 28-year-old Conrad had sent five letters to Joseph Spiridion, (Note: Joseph Spiridion's full name was "Joseph Spiridion Kliszczewski" but he used the abbreviated form, presumably from deference to British ignorance of Polish pronunciation. Conrad seems to have picked up this idea from Spiridion: in his fourth letter, he signed himself "J. Conrad"—the first recorded use of his future pen name.) a Pole eight years his senior whom he had befriended at Cardiff in June 1885 just before the Tilkhurst sailed for Singapore. These letters are Conrad's first preserved texts in English. His English is generally correct but stiff to the point of artificiality; many fragments suggest that his thoughts ran along the lines of Polish syntax and phraseology. More importantly, the letters show a marked change in views from those implied in his earlier correspondence of 1881–83. He had departed from "hope for the future" and from the conceit of "sailing [ever] toward Poland", and from his Panslavic ideas. He was left with a painful sense of the hopelessness of the Polish question and an acceptance of England as a possible refuge. While he often adjusted his statements to accord to some extent with the views of his addressees, the theme of hopelessness concerning the prospects for Polish independence often occurs authentically in his correspondence and works before 1914.

Feeling "sick and tired of sailing about for little money and less consideration," Conrad sought Spiridion's advice about the feasibility of engaging in the whaling business—perhaps he hoped to obtain a loan for that purpose from Spiridion and his father. Spiridion later told Jean-Aubry that he dissuaded his young friend from the enterprise.

The Tilkhurst arrived in Dundee on 16 June 1886. Conrad signed off the same day. Two letters from uncle Bobrowski awaited him in London. In one, the uncle wrote: "I deduce from your and [Conrad's business associate Adolf] Krieger's letters [that] you intend to devote yourself to trade and stay in London." He urged Conrad to first pass his ship master's examination and obtain British naturalization.

On 28 July 1886 Conrad failed in his first attempt to pass the master mariner's examination; he again never acknowledged this, to his uncle or to the reading public of his A Personal Record. On 10 November, on the second attempt, he passed the master mariner's examination.

=== Master ===
On 16 February 1887 he signed on as first mate of an iron barque, the Highland Forest, lying in port at Amsterdam. The ship had a crew of 18, including as many as 14 foreigners. The captain was a 34-year-old Irishman, John McWhir (Conrad gave the same name, with an additional r, to the much older master of the Nan-Shan in the 1902 novel Typhoon). The Highland Forest left Amsterdam on 18 February and ran into strong gales. By Conrad's account, some spars were carried away, and a piece of one struck and injured him. On 20 June the ship reached Semarang, Java, and Conrad signed off on 1 July. Next day he boarded the steamship Celestial, disembarking on 6 July at Singapore, where he went for treatment to the European Hospital; Conrad would describe it in his 1900 novel Lord Jim, whose hero had likewise been injured by a falling spar.

The first mate of the SS Celestial, which had brought Conrad to Singapore, was Frederick Havelock Brooksbank, son-in-law of the then well-known merchant and sailor William Lingard, prototype of Tom Lingard in Almayer's Folly (1895), An Outcast of the Islands (1896) and The Rescue (1920). Conrad never met William Lingard but heard much about him, mainly from Lingard's nephews, James and Joshua Lingard. It was probably through Brooksbank that Conrad met James Craig, master of the small steamer Vidar, which made voyages between Singapore and small ports on Borneo and Sulawesi. James (Jim) Lingard had been living for some years as a trading agent on Borneo, at Berau, on the Berau River. On 22 August 1887 Conrad sailed from Singapore in the Vidar as first mate; he made four voyages in her: 22 August – 26 September; 30 September – 31 October; 4 November – 1 December 1887; and the last, ending 2 January 1888.

Apart from the six days at Muntok in 1883, this was Conrad's first opportunity to see the East up close. The Vidar penetrated deep inland, steaming up the rivers. Of the six ports of call, four lay in the country's interior, two as much as 30 miles from the sea.

Against the primeval natural background of lush, insatiable, and putrefying vegetation [writes Najder] the trading posts must have appeared either as foolish challenges to the invincible forces of the tropics, or as pathetic proof of the vanity of human endeavor. [P]articularly grotesque must have been the impression made by white men, who, cut off from their own civilizations, often became alcoholics or hopeless cranks. [F]our such men lived at Tanjung Redeb [on the Berau River, including the Englishman] James Lingard... and a Eurasian Dutchman, Charles William Olmeijer (or Ohlmeijer), who had lived there for seventeen years.

Olmeijer, his name transcribed phonetically as "Almayer", became the protagonist of Conrad's first novel, Almayer's Folly (1895) and a hero of the second, An Outcast of the Islands (1896); he also appears in the autobiographical volume, A Personal Record (1912), where Conrad writes: "If I had not got to know Almayer pretty well it is almost certain there would never have been a line of mine in print." But as Jocelyn Baines observes, "This was paying Almayer too big a compliment because when someone is ready to write there will always be an Almayer to hand." In reality, Conrad did not get to know Olmeijer well at all. As he was to write in March 1917, "[W]e had no social shore connections. [I]t isn't very practicable for a seaman." A few days earlier, he had written his publisher: "... I knew very little of and about shore-people. I was chief mate of the S.S. Vidar and very busy whenever in harbour." Neither the pathetic Almayer of A Personal Record nor the tragic Almayer of Almayer's Folly have much in common with the real Olmeijer. Conrad used the names of people he met, and occasionally their external appearances, in his writings only as aids in creating a fictional world from his reminiscences, books that he had read, and his own imagination.

On 4 January 1888, "J. Korzeniowski," just turned 30, signed off the Vidar at Singapore. For two weeks, while waiting for a ship to Europe, he stayed at the Sailors' Home (for officers only), where he quarrelled with the steward, Phillips, an evangelist and temperance worker and an inspector of brothels—"in short," writes Najder, "a professional do-gooder." Three decades later, Conrad described his stay in The Shadow-Line (1917), a novel he termed "not a story really but exact autobiography"—a misleading description, writes Najder, as usual with Conrad's "autobiographical" pieces.

On 19 January 1888, he was appointed captain of the barque Otago and left by steamer for Bangkok, Siam (Thailand), where on 24 January he took up his first command. The Otago, the smallest vessel he had sailed in except for the coaster Vidar, left Bangkok on 9 February. After a three-day stop at Singapore, on 3 March it headed for Sydney, Australia, arriving on 7 May. On 22 May, it left for Melbourne; arriving 6 June after a difficult and stormy passage, it stayed at anchor in the Melbourne roadstead till 8 June. After taking on a load of 2,270 bags of wheat, it left for Sydney on 7 July. Arriving five days later, it stayed until 7 August.

The Otago's next voyage, with a cargo of fertilizer, soap and tallow, was to Mauritius, then a British possession east of Madagascar in the southwest Indian Ocean. The ship reached Port Louis on 30 September 1888, setting sail again for Melbourne on 21 November 1888 with a cargo of sugar, arriving on 5 January 1889. The Otago stayed close to the Australian coast. After being towed to Port Phillip Bay and visiting Port Minlacowie in Spencer Gulf, the Otago sailed around the Yorke Peninsula, arriving at Port Adelaide on 26 March 1889. Soon after, Captain Korzeniowski gave up his command. He was, Najder explains, "not a typical seaman... [H]e did not regard his work at sea as permanent... [A]bove all... he had exceptionally wide-ranging interests and cultural needs. Once the first charm of commanding a ship faded, the future writer must have felt the dreariness of sailing in the Antipodes... He must have been oppressed by a sense of being cut off from Europe, deprived of newspapers, books and current news. Even the chances of improving his English were slight: one of his officers in the Otago was a German and the other a Finn. [T]he command of a small barque with a crew of nine could satisfy neither [Conrad's] ambitions nor his needs."

Korzeniowski left Port Adelaide on 3 April as a passenger on the German steamer Nürnberg (listed as "Captain Conrad") and, passing through the Suez Canal, disembarked on 14 May at Southampton, England.

Conrad's success in the British Merchant Navy so far had been modest. He had not been captain or first mate in a large vessel, nor had he worked for a firm of importance. "His foreign origin and looks," writes Najder, "were no help to him." Nor had he reached the highest rank in seamanship at the time (which would be discontinued a century later, in the 1990s), that of Extra Master, which required an additional examination. For the time being, he lived on his savings and a modest income from his share in the firm of Baar, Moering & Company.

In the autumn of 1889 Conrad began writing his first novel, Almayer's Folly.

[T]he son of a writer, praised by his [maternal] uncle [Tadeusz Bobrowski] for the beautiful style of his letters, the man who from the very first page showed a serious, professional approach to his work, presented his start on Almayer's Folly as a casual and non-binding incident... [Y]et he must have felt a pronounced need to write. Every page right from th[e] first one testifies that writing was not something he took up for amusement or to pass time. Just the contrary: it was a serious undertaking, supported by careful, diligent reading of the masters and aimed at shaping his own attitude to art and to reality.... [W]e do not know the sources of his artistic impulses and creative gifts.

Conrad's later letters to literary friends show the attention that he devoted to analysis of style, to individual words and expressions, to the emotional tone of phrases, to the atmosphere created by language. In this, Conrad in his own way followed the example of Gustave Flaubert, notorious for searching days on end for le mot juste—for the right word to render the "essence of the matter." Najder opines: "[W]riting in a foreign language admits a greater temerity in tackling personally sensitive problems, for it leaves uncommitted the most spontaneous, deeper reaches of the psyche, and allows a greater distance in treating matters we would hardly dare approach in the language of our childhood. As a rule it is easier both to swear and to analyze dispassionately in an acquired language." Years later Conrad, when asked why he did not write in French, which he spoke fluently, would reply (puckishly?): "Ah... to write French you have to know it. English is so plastic—if you haven't got the word you can make it."

==== African interlude ====
With the chances of finding a new job in England seeming slender, Conrad made inquiries on the European Continent. In the first half of November 1889 he traveled to Brussels, Belgium, to meet Albert Thys, the powerful deputy director of the Société Anonyme Belge pour le Commerce du Haut-Congo. Apparently the idea of working in Africa had occurred to Conrad for lack of something else; but it probably rekindled his old interest, recently revived by Henry Morton Stanley's expedition to rescue Emin Pasha. Additionally, the work paid better than a command at sea.

After Johannes Freiesleben, Danish master of the steamship Florida, was murdered by Congo tribesmen on 29 January 1890, Conrad was appointed by Thys' company to take his place. On 10 May 1890, at Bordeaux, he boarded the SS Ville de Maceio to begin what Najder calls "the most traumatic journey of his life."

After his November 1889 meeting with Thys, and before departing for the Congo, Conrad had again gone to Brussels, on 5 February 1890, where he made the acquaintance of a distant relative, Aleksander Poradowski, who had emigrated from Poland after the 1863 Uprising, and who died two days after Conrad's arrival. Conrad's meeting with Poradowski's widow Marguerite, née Gachet, would prove an important event in his life. His 42-year-old "aunt", daughter of a French historian who had settled in Belgium, was a writer whose translations from Polish, and her own fiction, mostly based on Polish and Ukrainian motifs, had been published since 1880 in the renowned Revue des Deux Mondes. For probably the first time since childhood, Conrad had come in direct contact with someone actively engaged in literature.

A few days later Conrad had left for Warsaw, arriving on 9 or 10 February and staying until 12 February. Then he made a two-day visit to Lublin to see his relatives Aniela and Karol Zagórski. On 16 February he was driven in a sleigh from Kalinówka railway station to Kazimierówka, visiting his uncle Bobrowski there till 18 April. At social gatherings, Conrad put off some of the participants. One of them recalled: "He answered all questions with a strained politeness, he spoke with concentration and listened carefully but one could not fail to notice his extreme boredom.... He spoke with a hint of a foreign accent and occasional bursts of our characteristic borderland intonation." Najder interprets Conrad's demeanor:

An inhabitant of London, the capital of the world's richest and most powerful country, comes to a village in the backwoods of... Ukraine. He is a traveler who has seen a great deal and is... under contract with a huge company, which is supposed not only to profit from trade but also to civilize black Africa. The traveler is a Pole, but without hope that his partitioned motherland will ever become free and unified; he is conscious... that in the modern prosperous and open world no one is interested in Polish affairs and very few even know where the country is, and he is aware that to be continually harping on wrongs, suffering, and oppression evokes, at best, pity mixed with repugnance.

En route to the Congo, near Grand-Popo, Benin, Conrad saw a French man-of-war, Le Seignelay, shelling a native camp hidden in the jungle. The incident would acquire symbolic import in Heart of Darkness (1899).

On 12 June 1890 the Ville de Maceio reached Boma, 50 miles up from the Congo River estuary. Next day Conrad boarded a small steamer for Matadi, 30 miles farther up, and five miles below the last navigable point on the lower Congo River before rapids make it impassable for a long stretch upriver—the chief Congo seaport, founded as late as 1879 by Henry Morton Stanley. At Matadi Conrad was held up for 15 days and met Roger Casement, who had already been working several years in the Congo. The diary that Conrad kept uniquely for his first 67 days in the Congo (Note: The diary is one of Conrad's earliest known English texts. Najder comments: "Here and there are signs of French influence on the vocabulary, and Polish on the syntax, showing that the future writer had not yet completely mastered English.") shows that he thought very highly of Casement, the future author of a 1904 report on atrocities perpetrated against the native Congolese population, for his own personal profit, by Belgium's King Leopold II. (Note: Mark Twain would satirize Leopold's criminal malfeasance in his 1905 pamphlet, King Leopold's Soliloquy.) (Note: When Casement was later tried by the British in 1916 on charges of treason for supporting the Irish independence movement, Conrad hoped he would not be sentenced to death; but when Casement was condemned to hang, Conrad declined to join in the appeal for clemency signed by many English writers. He later explained: "Casement did not hesitate to accept honours, decorations and distinctions from the English Government while surreptitiously arranging various affairs that he was embroiled in. In short: he was plotting against those who trusted him.")

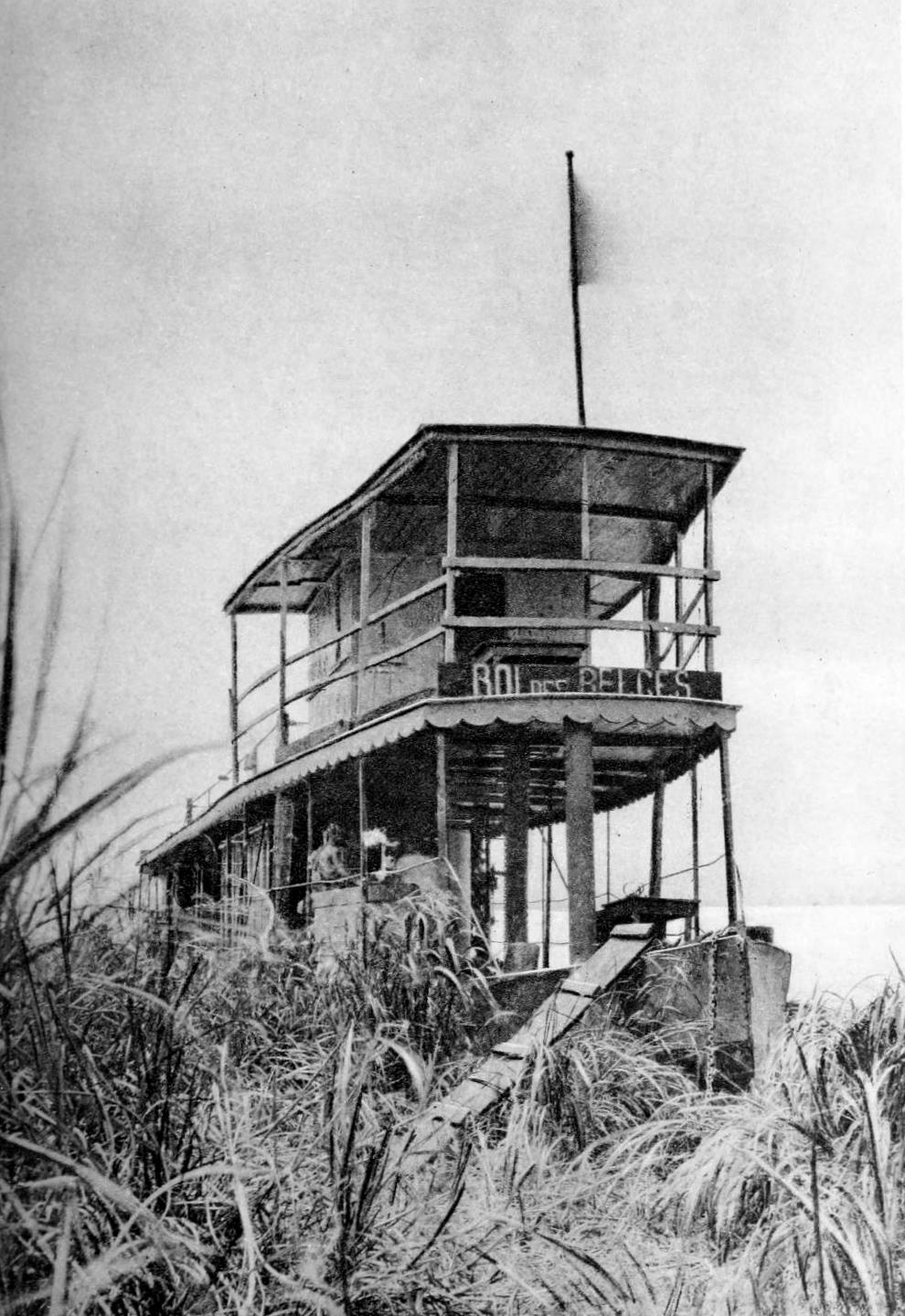
Roi des Belges, in which Conrad sailed up the Congo River (1890)

It was only on 28 June that Conrad could begin the tedious 230-mile overland trek to the port of Kinshasa, which he completed on 2 August 1890. The steamer Florida, which he was to have commanded, had been seriously damaged and was unfit for sailing. In any case, he could not have taken command immediately on an unfamiliar river; next day he boarded the river steamer Roi des Belges (King of the Belgians), commanded by a young Dane, Ludvig Rasmus Koch.

The small, clumsy, noisy river steamer left Kinshasa on 3 August 1890, bound up the Congo River. On the way, over a distance of more than 500 miles, Conrad spotted no more than six villages; later, says Najder, Heart of Darkness would "convincingly depict... the threatening atmosphere of isolation." The country, formerly rich, had been entirely ruined by the effects of Belgian colonization. One of the four company officials aboard the steamer was Alphonse Keyaerts, whose name Conrad would appropriate for the character Kayerts in his other African tale, "An Outpost of Progress" (1897).

On 1 September 1890 the steamer reached Stanley Falls (now Kisangani), then an important Congo Free State government center. On 6 September, Conrad was appointed "to take over the command of the SS Roi des Belges... until the recovery of Captain Koch." This, writes Najder, "constitutes the only basis for Conrad's later claim of having commanded a 'steamer.'" The ship probably left Stanley Falls back for Kinshasa on 7 or 8 September. On board was Georges-Antoine Klein, a young Frenchman who had recently been appointed the company's commercial agent at Stanley Falls. On 21 September, Klein, who had been ill with dysentery, died. His name (later changed to "Kurtz") appears in the manuscript of Heart of Darkness; otherwise the Frenchman seems not to have had much in common with the novel's character.

It is unknown whether or how long Conrad was in command of the Roi des Belges on the way to Kinshasa. When the ship arrived at Bangala on 15 September 1890, Captain Koch was already back in charge.

Arriving back at Kinshasa on 24 September 1890, Conrad found a letter from Maria Bobrowska, in Poland—the daughter of his uncle Tadeusz Bobrowski's brother, Kazimierz Bobrowski; and three letters from Marguerite Poradowska. Conrad wrote Poradowska:

I find everything repugnant here. Men and things, but especially men.... The director is a common ivory-dealer with sordid instincts who imagines himself a merchant while in fact he is only a kind of African shopkeeper. His name is [Camille] Delcommune. He hates the English, and I am of course regarded as one. While he is here I can hope for neither promotion nor a raise in salary.... I have no vessel to command.... [M]ost of all I regret having tied myself down for three years. True, it is hardly likely that I shall last them out. Either they will pick some groundless quarrel with me to send me home... or another attack of dysentery will send me back to Europe, if not into the other world, which would at last finally solve all my troubles!

Najder traces Conrad's conflicts with Delcommune and the other Société Anonyme Belge employees to the "sordid instincts" that motivated Delcommune and the company. "'Unreliable' persons [such as] Korzeniowski... are not admitted to business." Agents were paid high premiums for reducing the costs of obtaining rubber and ivory. Massive deliveries were made compulsory; and punitive expeditions, by members of hostile tribes and cannibals, were sent against non-complying natives. For the natives, the enforced deliveries often meant starvation, since they were left with no time to grow and harvest their crops.

On 26 September 1890 Conrad left Kinshasa by canoe for Bamou, 30 miles down-river, to get wood cut for the construction of the local station. There he fell ill with dysentery and fever. On 19 October he wrote his uncle Bobrowski from Kinshasa that he was unwell and intended to return to Europe. By 4 December he was back at Matadi. It is not known when and on what ship he returned to Europe. In late January 1891 he appeared in Brussels; on 1 February he was in London. His letters do not mention his recent experiences; he apparently wanted only to forget. As would be suggested in Heart of Darkness (1899), Conrad was aware how close he had been to himself becoming one of the European despoilers of Africa. His experiences there reinforced his mistrust of human nature.

Conrad's African experience made him one of the fiercest critics of the "white man's mission." It was also, writes Najder, his most daring and last "attempt to become... a cog in the mechanism of society. By accepting the job in the trading company, he joined, for once in his life, an organized, large-scale group activity on land.... Until his death he remained a recluse... and never became involved with any institution or clearly defined group of people."

==== Return to the British marine ====
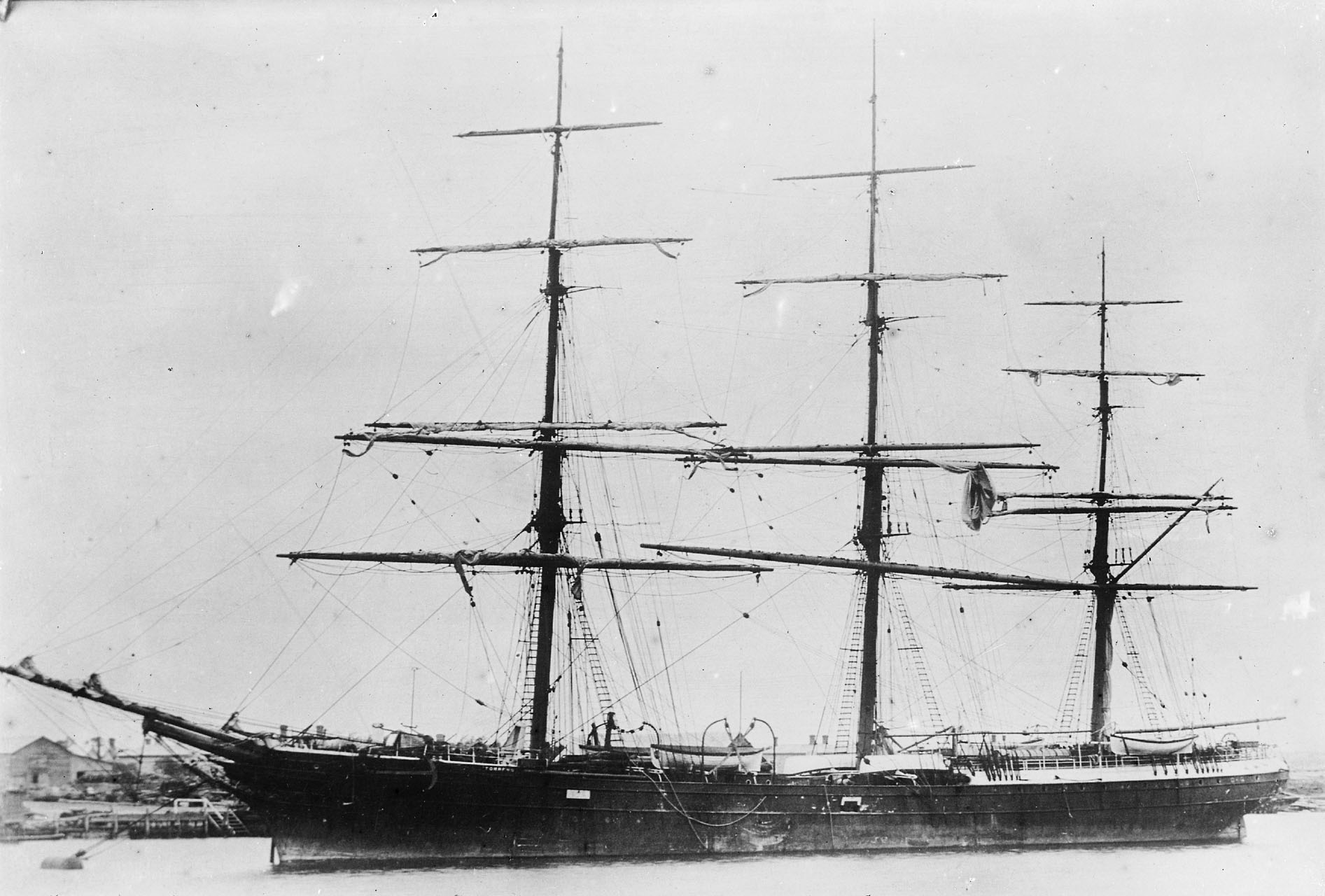
Passenger clipper ship Torrens, in which Conrad made two round trips as first mate, from London to Adelaide, Australia, between 21 November 1891 and 26 July 1893

Conrad spent some months at loose ends and apparently depressed. On 14 November 1891, he decided to step down in rank and accept a berth as first mate in the passenger clipper ship Torrens. Seven days later the ship left London for Australia, on the way picking up passengers at Plymouth.

It was possibly the finest ship ever launched (1875) from a Sunderland yard. For fifteen years (1875–90), no ship approached her speed for the outward passage to Australia. On her record-breaking run to Adelaide, she covered 16,000 miles (26,000 km) in 64 days. Conrad writes of her:

A ship of brilliant qualities – the way the ship had of letting big seas slip under her did one's heart good to watch. It resembled so much an exhibition of intelligent grace and unerring skill that it could fascinate even the least seamanlike of our passengers.

It was the first time Conrad had served on a passenger boat, and it provided opportunities for social contacts with members of the educated class; Conrad made his first acquaintances with Englishmen who were not seamen. During four long voyages in the Torrens Conrad enjoyed a much more cultivated atmosphere than on any ship he had previously served on.

After a calm passage of a hundred days, on 28 February 1892 the Torrens arrived in Adelaide. Conrad spent over a month in Australia. While he was there, a letter from his Uncle Bobrowski informed him that Conrad's cousin Stanisław Bobrowski had been accused, in essence, of social propaganda with "a tint of [Polish] nationalism" and had been jailed in the same Warsaw Citadel where Conrad's father had once been held.

On 10 April 1892 Conrad left Adelaide in the Torrens and, after 145 days, with stops at Cape Town, South Africa, and Saint Helena, on 2 September arrived in London. He stayed there almost two months, undecided about his future. He would have liked to have had a ship's command, but that did not seem possible.

On 25 October 1892 he left London again aboard the Torrens. Sea voyages were then considered a health cure, especially for tuberculosis; two convalescing passengers died on the way. Another, William Henry Jacques, a consumptive Cambridge graduate who died less than a year later (19 September 1893), was, according to Conrad's A Personal Record, the first reader of the still-unfinished manuscript of Almayer's Folly, and Jacques encouraged Conrad to continue writing the novel. After a passage of 97 days, on 30 January 1893, the Torrens arrived at Port Adelaide. Writing to Poradowska, Conrad complained of "the uniform grey of my existence" and expressed nostalgia for cultivated life and the broad intellectual interests of his correspondent's milieu.

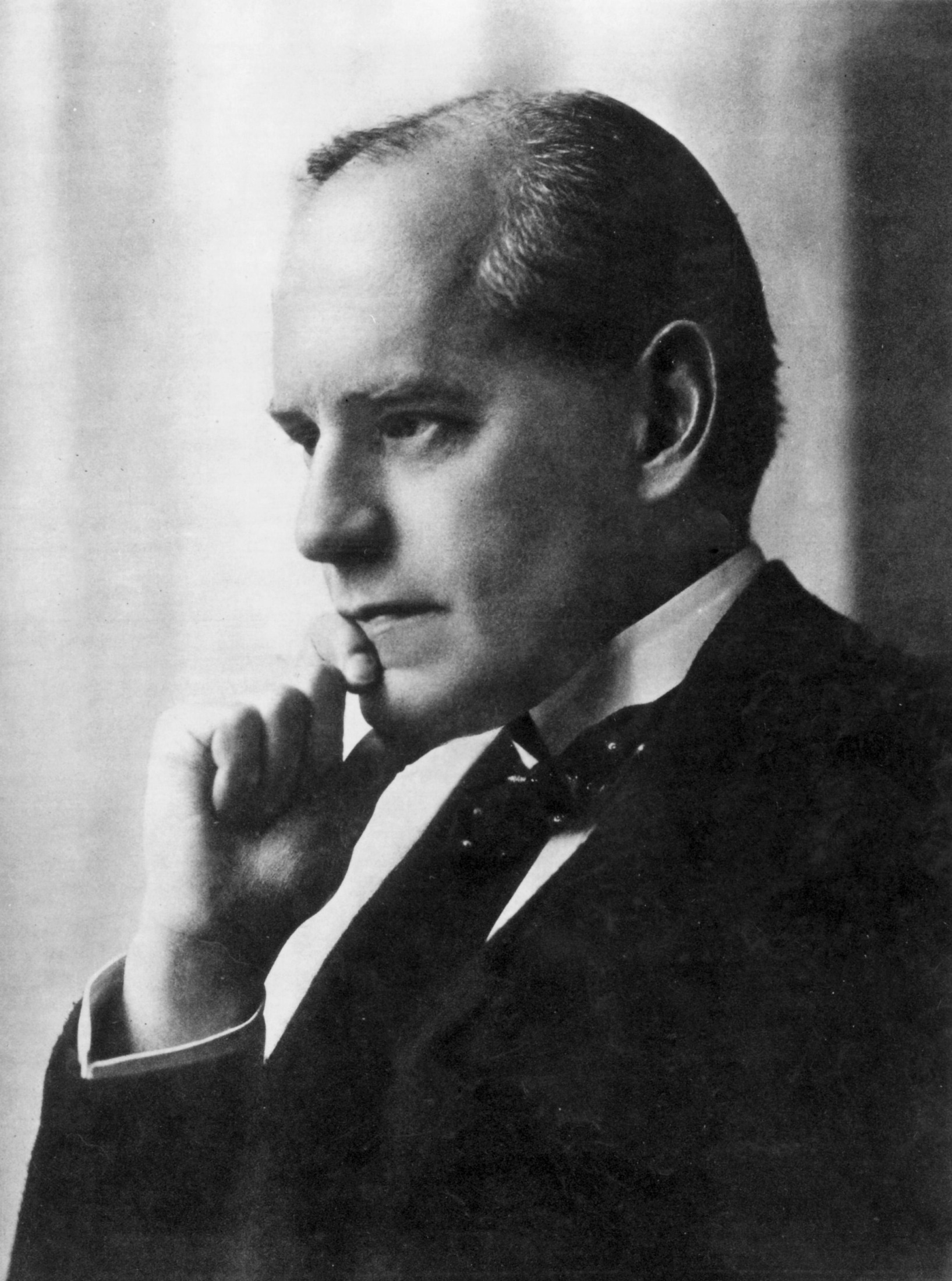
John Galsworthy, whom Conrad met on the Torrens

When the Torrens left Adelaide on 13 March 1893, the passengers included two young Englishmen returning from Australia and New Zealand: 25-year-old lawyer and future novelist John Galsworthy; and Edward Lancelot Sanderson, who was going to help his father run a boys' preparatory school at Elstree. They were probably the first Englishmen and non-sailors with whom Conrad struck up a friendship. The protagonist of one of Galsworthy's first literary attempts, "The Doldrums" (1895–96), the first mate Armand, is obviously modeled on Conrad. At Cape Town, where the Torrens remained from 17 to 19 May, Galsworthy left the ship to look at the local mines. Sanderson continued his voyage and seems to have been the first to develop closer ties with Conrad. On 26 July 1893 the Torrens docked at London, and "J. Conrad Korzemowin" (per the certificate of discharge) had, without knowing it, completed his last long-distance voyage as a seaman.

In London, letters awaited him from his Uncle Tadeusz Bobrowski, who was in poor health. They discussed Conrad's prospective visit to the uncle and informed Conrad of the trial of his cousin Stanisław Bobrowski—sentenced to 18 months' imprisonment, not counting over a year spent under arrest, and sent to a St. Petersburg prison.

Conrad resigned from the Torrens, probably because he had lost hope of succeeding his friend W.H. Cope as its captain, and possibly because he was tired of the sailor's profession. He left for Ukraine most likely in early August 1893 and remained with his mentor-uncle at Kazimierówka for over a month. He wrote Poradowska that he had spent five days ill in bed, "nursed [by Uncle Tadeusz] as if I were a little child." She, in a letter, made something of a jealous scene over Maria Ołdakowska, a niece of her late husband Aleksander Poradowski who was getting married.

Najder writes that a graph of Conrad's sailing career would be "a broken line, but one that climbs between 1874 and 1889.... The expedition to Africa stops this upward climb and marks the beginning of a steady... decline. After three years the captain is back to being only second mate, and in a ship going nowhere." That ship was the 2,097-ton steamer Adowa (named for a historic town in Ethiopia), which was to carry emigrants from France to Quebec. Conrad signed on in London on 29 November 1893. On 4 December the Adowa put in at Rouen. She was expected to leave 9 December for La Rochelle and from there for Quebec City, but passengers failed to materialize—the French showed no eagerness to join in the late-19th-century waves of emigration to the New World—and the steamer remained idle in France. Writing Poradowska, Conrad considered the possibility of a job as a pilot on the Suez Canal. Bored at Rouen, he there began work on chapter 10 (of the 12 chapters) of Almayer's Folly. He wrote Poradowska jokingly how he was taken at the post office for a bomb-carrying anarchist; France was then the scene of many acts of violence, including bombings.

On 10 January 1894 the Adowa left Rouen for London. On 17 January 36-year-old "J. Conrad" disembarked and unknowingly ended his service at sea.

Six months later, as one of 176 witnesses, he testified before the Board of Trade's Departmental Committee on the Manning of Merchant Ships. He stated that the Adowa was not sufficiently manned, but considered the manning of the Skimmer of the Seas, the Otago and the Torrens satisfactory. Conrad departed from the truth in reporting the length of his service and posts held. He maintained that he had spent 18 months on the Congo River "in command of a steamer," when in fact he had spent only six weeks on the Congo; he also added three months to his command of the Otago, and claimed that he had made two voyages to Mauritius and two passages through Torres Strait; he lengthened his service in the Torrens by three months; and he alleged that he had made a transatlantic voyage in the Adowa. He was silent about his service in French ships, and about all his Continental European connections generally.

In fact, during the 19 years from the time that Conrad had left Kraków in October 1874 until he signed off the Adowa in January 1894, he had worked in ships, including long periods in ports, for 10 years and almost 8 months. He had spent just over 8 years at sea—9 months of this as a passenger.

He had served as a crew member (steward, apprentice, able-bodied seaman) for over two and a half years (21 months of that at sea); as third mate, 8 months; as second mate (his longest service), almost 4 years (only two and a half years of that at sea); as first mate, two years and three months (two years of that at sea); as captain, one year and two months (half of that at sea). Of his nearly 11 years at sea, 9 months were in steamers.

A bequest from Conrad's uncle and mentor, Tadeusz Bobrowski (who had died on 1 January 1894)—which bequest Conrad, typically, would soon manage to lose—for the moment made it easier for him to retire from the sea and devote himself to a literary career.

== See also ==
- Joseph Conrad Square

== Sources ==
- Meyers, Jeffrey (1991). Joseph Conrad: A Biography. Charles Scribner's Sons. ISBN 9780684192307.
- Najder, Zdzisław (2007). Joseph Conrad: A Life. Camden House. ISBN 978-1-57113-347-2.
