= Columbus Square =

Columbus Square may refer to:

- Columbus Square (Madrid)
- Columbus Square, New York City
- Columbus Square (Providence)
- Columbus Square, St. Louis
- Columbus Square, San Francisco, now Joseph Conrad Square
