= A Personal Record =

1912 book by Joseph Conrad

- UK edition
- Author: Joseph Conrad
- Language: English
- Genre: Autobiography
- Published: 1912

A Personal Record is an autobiographical work (or "fragment of biography") by Joseph Conrad, published in 1912.

It has also been published under the titles A Personal Record: Some Reminiscences and Some Reminiscences.

Considered unreliable and digressive by some, it is nonetheless the principal contemporary source for information about the author's life. It tells about his schooling in Russian Poland, his sailing in Marseille, the influence of his uncle Tadeusz Bobrowski, and the writing of Almayer's Folly.

It provides a glimpse of how Conrad wished to be seen by his British public, as well as being an atmospheric work of art.

The "Familiar Preface" Conrad wrote for it includes the often quoted lines:

"Those who read me know my conviction that the world, the temporal world, rests on a few very simple ideas; so simple that they must be as old as the hills. It rests notably, among others, on the idea of Fidelity."

Conrad wrote a new 'Author's Note' to A Personal Record for the Doubleday collected edition of his works (published in 1920) in which he discussed his friendship with the British colonial official and writer Hugh Clifford.
