= Tadeusz Bobrowski =

Polish-Ukrainian landowner and mentor of Joseph Conrad

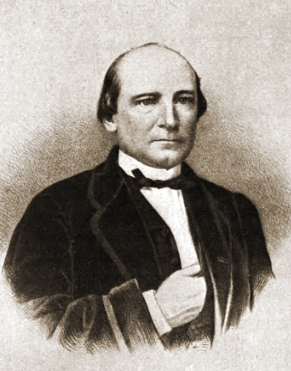
Tadeusz Bobrowski

Tadeusz Bobrowski (1829–1894) was a Polish landowner living in Ukraine, best known outside Poland as the guardian and mentor of his nephew Józef Konrad Korzeniowski, who would later become the well-known English-language novelist Joseph Conrad.

Bobrowski's memoir, as well as providing valuable insights into Conrad's life, is deemed a reliable picture of the Polish society of its time, in the Kresy (borderlands).

== Life ==
=== Early life ===
Born March 19, 1829, in Terechów, a village in Berdychiv County, Ukraine (then part of the Russian Empire), he was the son of Józef and Teofilia, née Pilchowska, and brother of Stefan Bobrowski, a leader of the Polish January 1863 Uprising. Tadeusz attended secondary school till 1839 in Żytomierz, then in Kiev.

In 1844 he matriculated in law at Kiev; two years later, he transferred to St. Petersburg. Very gifted, in his 22nd year (1850) he left university with a master's degree in international law. He declined an offer to assume the chair in that subject at Kazan University, as he intended instead to devote himself to an administrative career.

These plans were upset by his father's death in 1850. Bobrowski had to return to the family estate at Oratów and look after his mother, his siblings and the running of the estate. As his portion of the family legacy he received the estate known as Kazimierówka.

=== Politician ===
Taciturn and plain-spoken, a rationalist and an opponent of insurgencies, Bobrowski found little sympathy among the szlachta (nobility), though he was capable of earning their respect; and so he did not play that social role to which he might otherwise have been entitled by his legal education and intellect.

Elected in 1858 as the delegate of Lipowiec County to the nobility's Committee for granting farmland to the peasants (uwłaszczenie), he became that Committee's delegate to a general Commission of three Ukrainian provinces: Kiev, Volhynia and Podolia. He was among the most active members of the Commission, the leader of a moderately progressive group that supported the outright granting of farmland to the peasants following a transitional rental (oczynszowanie) period.

In later years, Bobrowski became an unpaid judge in Lipowiec County.

He died on January 1, 1894, at Kazimierówka.

Bobrowski left a Memoir of no small literary value, a wide-ranging, richly detailed picture of Ukrainian life in the mid-19th century, whose caustic character and numerous indiscretions evoked violent protests upon its publication in 1900. The Memoirs' second volume, drawn from the Commission's minutes, is a valuable source on the history of the granting of farmland to Ukraine's peasants.

=== Conrad's mentor ===
A recluse, early bereft of his family (his wife died in childbirth in 1858, and his daughter in her 15th year), Bobrowski became deeply devoted to his nephew, the son of Ewelina Korzeniowska, née Bobrowska—Konrad Korzeniowski, the future English-language novelist Joseph Conrad. Before Conrad's father died in 1869, the boy was under Bobrowski's care in 1866-67, and later Bobrowski became his guardian. At first opposed to the boy's desire to become a sailor, he ultimately relented.

Over the next twenty years after Konrad went abroad in 1874, they saw each other only four times: at news of Conrad's having been wounded in a duel in Marseille, Bobrowski went to him in March 1878; in the summer of 1883 they met in the Czech spa towns of Marienbad and Teplice; in 1890 and 1893 Conrad spent two months, on each occasion, at his uncle's Kazimierówka. But, via ongoing correspondence, the uncle systematically influenced his nephew, admonished him—in particular, taught him constancy and fidelity to obligations once undertaken—and aided him financially.

Bobrowski was Conrad's constant link with Poland, and exerted much influence on him. Whatever positive aspects his character possessed, the novelist would later write, he owed to his uncle's devotion, solicitude and influence. "There is," writes Wiktor Weintraub, "naturally much exaggeration in this assertion of Conrad's, but it is a very characteristic exaggeration." Both of Conrad's autobiographical books, The Mirror of the Sea and especially A Personal Record, contain heartfelt reminiscences of Bobrowski. Conrad dedicated his first novel, Almayer's Folly, to his memory.

== See also ==
- January Uprising
- Land reform
- Polish–Lithuanian Commonwealth
- Szlachta
