= Wanda Tomczykowska =

Polish-American organization executive

Wanda Tomczykowska (August 29, 1921 – March 2, 2010) was the founder of The Polish Arts and Culture Foundation, San Francisco, California. Between 1966 and 2002 she was the organisation's president.

== Early life ==
Tomczykowska was born in Bytom, Poland, to Leon Krawczyk and Paulina Fichna. She had two brothers, Stanislaw and Boleslaw, who were enslaved by the Nazis during World War II in the coal mines of Silesia and died in middle age from the health effects of that experience.

== Family ==
Leon was a well-known actor in the Bytom Theatre and a close confidant of Wojciech Korfanty during the 1921 Silesian Uprising. At the outbreak of World War II Leon, who was on the Nazis' wanted list, went into hiding. In the war's first weeks, the Nazis sent Wanda to a labor camp and unsuccessfully tried to use her as a hostage to uncover her father’s whereabouts. Wanda was later placed as a servant in the household of a German tycoon and his Polish wife, who surreptitiously "adopted" her and six months later presented her in grand style to Berlin society as the tycoon's illegitimate daughter, thus saving Wanda's life.

== World War II ==
During the War, Tomczykowska worked as a translator, interpreter and goodwill ambassador, a role she continued to play until ill-health forced her into retirement in 2002. In Berlin she met her future husband, Zygmunt Tomczykowski of Boston, Massachusetts, serving with the US Army in Berlin. A decorated war hero, they married in April 1946 – the first GI wedding in Berlin, with much press and fanfare.

== In America ==
The following year they traveled back to his home with their infant daughter, Caria, settling in Lynn, Massachusetts. Tomczykowska became very involved with the Refugee Projects after the war, helping distribute food and clothing to new immigrants. She was also instrumental in creating a Polish Folk Dance Group affiliated with St. Michael's Church in Lynn. The White Eagle Café in Watertown was a popular eatery in the area, and Zygmunt and his partner managed it together until Zygmunt’s war-related injuries took their toll. He died on August 26, 1950, and is buried in St. Joseph's Cemetery along with his parents.

After Zygmunt's death, Tomczykowska and Caria moved to Cambridge, Massachusetts, where Tomczykowska was employed at the Widener Library at Harvard University for several years before once again moving to take a position in the Slavic Acquisitions Department at the University of California at Berkeley's Main Library.

Remembering but not reliving the agonies experienced during the war, Tomczykowska became an enthusiastic member of the People-to-People Program, creating Dance Around The World for the Bay Area and serving on the advisory boards of the International Institute, the UNA, IDC, Commonwealth Club, World Affairs Council and many other organizations. Always the avid patriot, Tomczykowska helped establish the Polish University Club and encouraged the University to participate in the Ford Fellowships with Poland, enabling scholars a new exchange possibility which had been so difficult during the Communist years. In 1966, after a 15-month-long trip around the world with Caria, Tomczykowska was a director at the Center of Higher Education, part of Cal Berkeley.

This in turn evolved into the establishment of The Polish Arts and Culture Foundation in 1966, the year of Poland’s Millennium. For 50 years the PACF has been the lead representative of Polish arts, culture, heritage and promise on the West Coast. The presentation of films, concerts, lectures, exhibits, seminars and conferences pertaining to Poland and its rich history, has been the main goal of the PACF. The guest list for many of these functions is a virtual Who’s Who: from composers, to authors, to painters, to historians, to artists, to Nobel Prize winners and presidents. Tomczykowska convinced San Francisco city officials to name a street after Solidarity leader Lech Wałęsa and a plaza after the Polish author Joseph Conrad Korzeniowski. St. Mary's Cathedral boasts a reproduction of The Black Madonna of Czestochowa icon at which Pope John Paul II said Mass during a visit to San Francisco.

In her collections of Polish memorabilia can be found valuable books and mementos of famous Poles. She had written numerous booklets on: Polish Christmas and Easter Traditions, Amber, Polish Contributions to California, To the United States and Poles at Jamestown, to name but a few. She also produced over 100 hours of the History of Polish Music broadcast locally on KPFA. Many television and radio interviews document Tomczykowska’s passionate devotion to her heritage and still maintains a reputation as the Doyenne of the Polish community. Tomczykowska was decorated in 2001 by the Polish Government with the Polonia Restituta Commander’s Cross for her decades-long work on behalf of Poland. Other previous commendations and acknowledgments line the walls of the office. The annual Gala Polonaise Ball has been the prime fund-raiser of the PACF, a non-profit, non-political and non-sectarian organization, whose existence and efforts have been supported by hundreds of loyal Polonia members and some corporate sponsorship. Thanks to Tomczykowska's unrelenting energy and determination, the PACF grew into a world-recognized institution. It is now in the able hands of her daughter, Caria Tomczykowska. The future plans for the PACF face many challenges, but with a renewed interest, they may finally come to pass. Tomczykowska had happily lived long enough to see a once-again Free Poland and watch it grow and prosper in a peaceful world. Part of that has come to pass.

In 2002, Tomczykowska flew to Poland for a well-deserved vacation, but suffered a stroke only ten days after arriving. Upon doctors orders, Caria placed her in a nursing home near Kraków since the medical prognosis was not great. Under their excellent care she lived another 8 years. From there she watched her ever-present patriotic efforts flourish in California.

In 2003 The PACF spearheaded the Splendor of Poland Cultural Events Committee offering the Bay Area over 30 cultural events during the Fine Arts Museums of San Francisco's 10-week exhibit at The Legion of Honor "Leonardo daVinci and the Splendor of Poland". Over 218,000 guests visited the museum in that time. Tomczykowska was so proud to know that the heroic history of Poland was being presented to an ever-growing audience. From that endeavor came a unique opportunity for Caria, when she was asked to translate some Polish documents for "The Rape of Europa" documentary film produced by Actual Films of San Francisco. The film sheds light on the myriad of stolen artworks by the Nazis during World War II. Engaging in the process, Caria became the film's Polish Field Producer, coordinating filming releases, interviews, travel arrangements, etc. It is now the third highest grossing box office documentary film for 2007, following "Sicko" and "No End in Sight".

Personally, Tomczykowska was very involved with her five grandchildren and got to know her first great-granddaughter before retiring to Kraków, Poland in 2002. Her oldest grandson added a second great granddaughter to the family in February 2008 and a third in October 2014.
