= Joseph Conrad Square =

Square in San Francisco, California, United States

Coordinates: 37°48′24″N 122°25′9″W

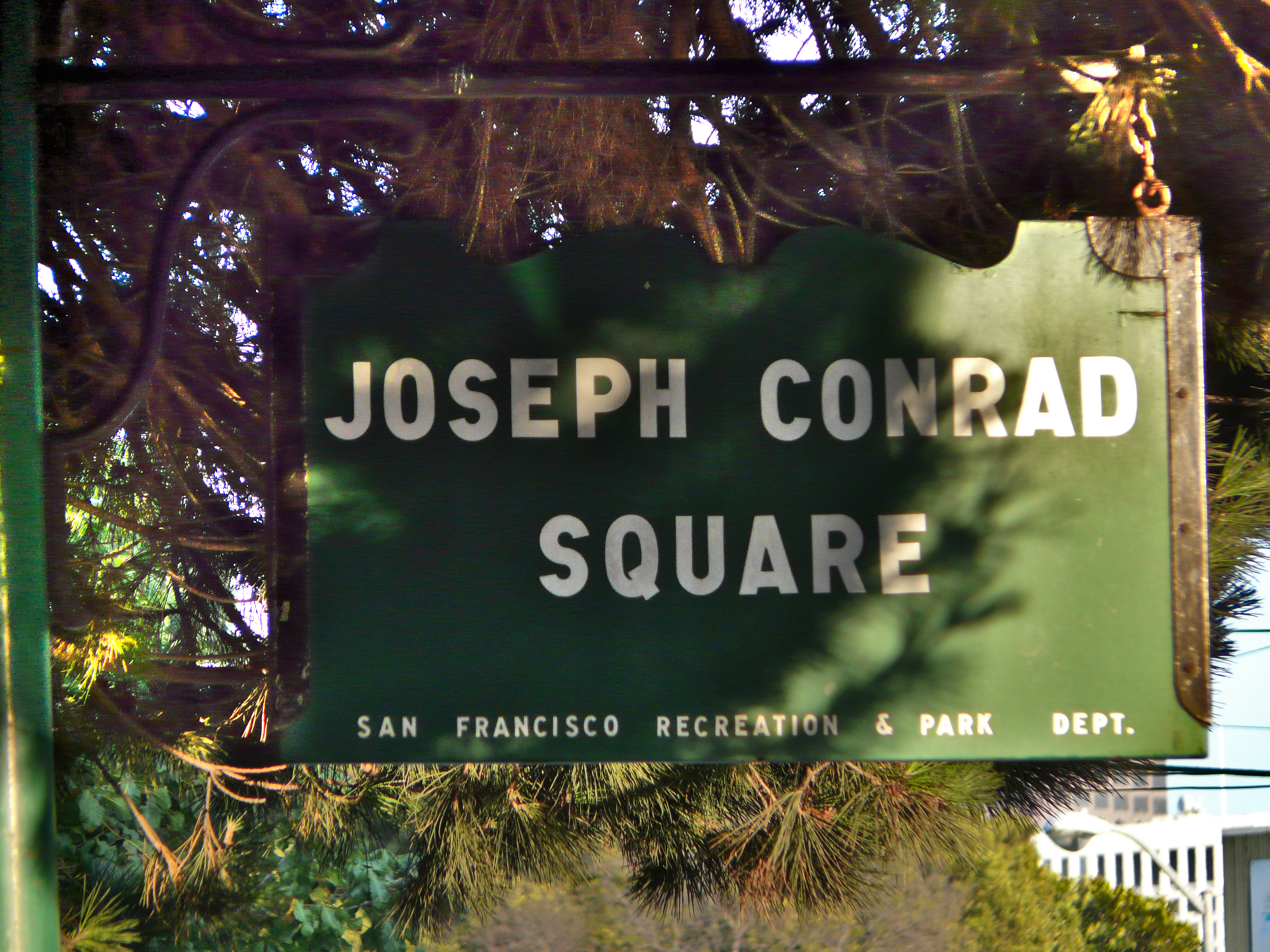

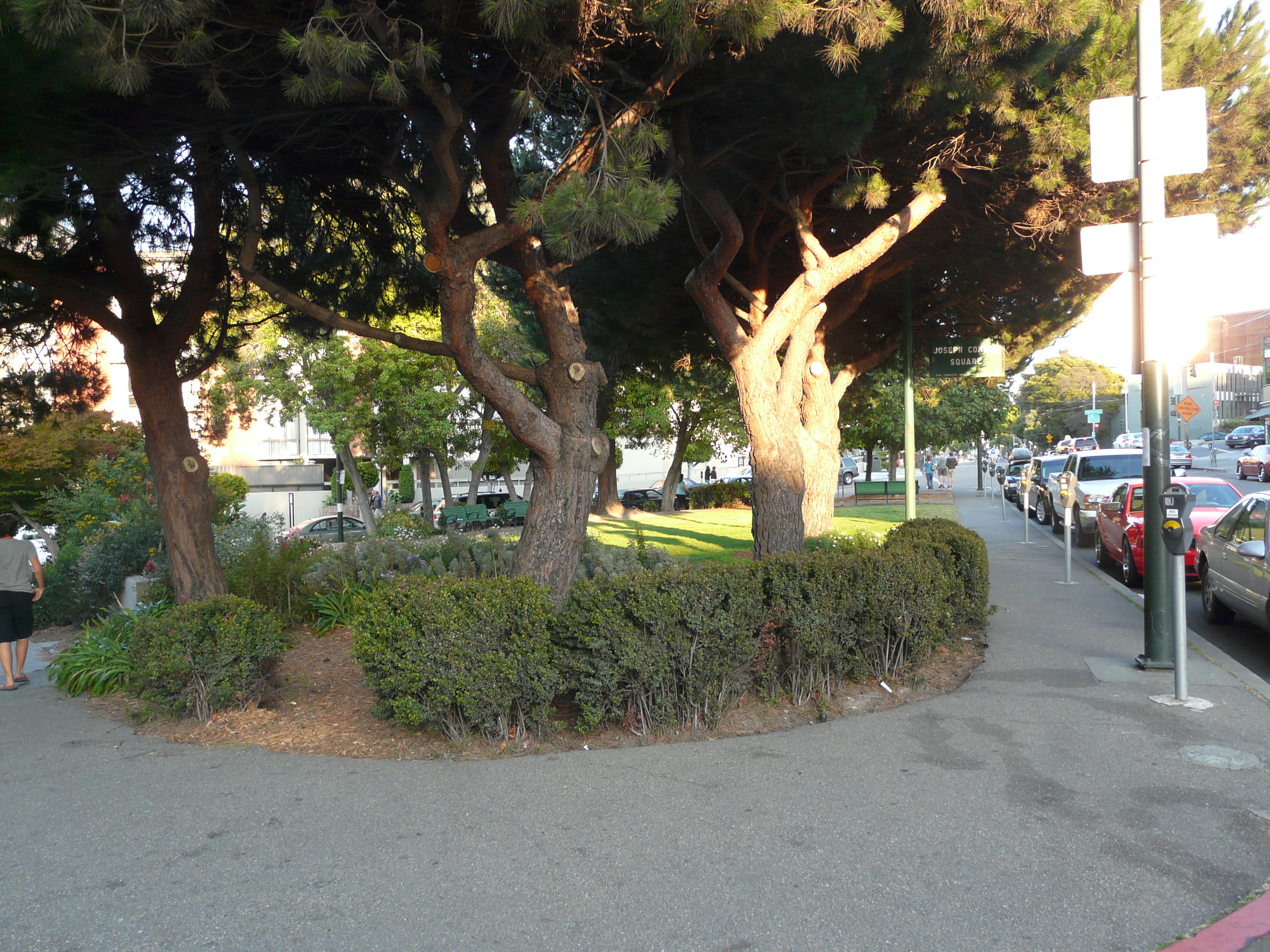
Joseph Conrad Square

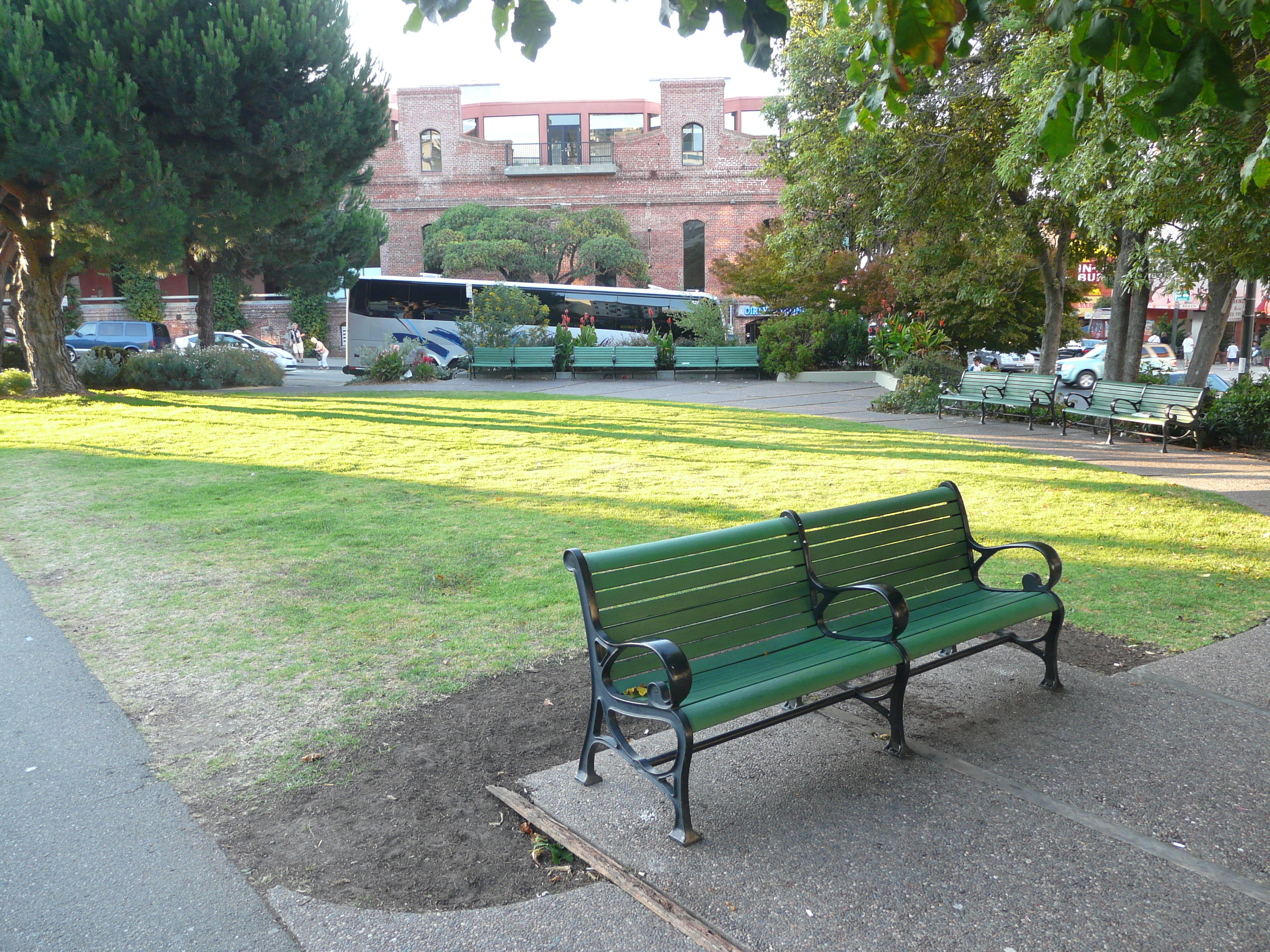
Joseph Conrad Square

Joseph Conrad Square is a small triangular square at Columbus Avenue and Beach Street, near Fisherman's Wharf in San Francisco, California.

== History ==
The park was dedicated in 1979 by Mayor Joseph Alioto and was named for sailor and novelist Joseph Conrad (who seems never to have visited San Francisco).

Leonard Martin, who transformed the abandoned Del Monte Plant #1 into The Cannery Shopping Plaza in 1967, had wanted to save the park (then called Columbus Square), as he thought it vital to maintain green spaces near his new shopping center.

The project to save the park was spearheaded by Wanda Tomczykowska, president of the Polish Arts and Culture Foundation.

Consideration was given to placing in the park the San Francisco Maritime Museum's copy of Jacob Epstein's 1924 bronze bust of Joseph Conrad, but the sculpture remains at the Museum due to concerns about potential vandalization if it were placed in the park.

The park's 1979 renaming and rededication, from Columbus Square to Joseph Conrad Square, coincided with the release of Francis Ford Coppola's film Apocalypse Now (15 August 1979), which was inspired by Joseph Conrad's novella Heart of Darkness.

In 1981-82 the park underwent a transformation by acclaimed landscape architect Garrett Eckbo (1910-2000) from a simple grass mini-park to a park with benches, paths, and landscaped areas. Since then the park has undergone several small renovations of the landscaped beds, the largest in 2020.
