= Marguerite Poradowska =

Belgian writer

Marguerite Gachet de la Fournière (12 March 1848, in Ixelles – 1937, in Nièvre) was a Belgian writer, who wrote under the pseudonym Marguerite Poradowska. Her book Les Filles du pope (1893) won the Jules-Favre Prize, and her books Demoiselle Micia (1899), and Pour Noémi (1900) won the Montyon Prize.
