= The Arrow of Gold =

1919 romance novel by Joseph Conrad

First UK edition (publ. T. Fisher Unwin)

The Arrow of Gold is a novel by Joseph Conrad, published in 1919. It was originally titled "The Laugh" and published serially in Lloyd's Magazine from December 1918 to February 1920. The story is set in Marseille in the 1870s during the Third Carlist War. The characters of the novel are supporters of the Spanish Pretender Carlos, Duke of Madrid. The novel features a person referred to as "Lord X", whose activities as arms smuggler resemble those of the Carlist politician Tirso de Olazábal y Lardizábal, Count of Arbelaiz.

The narrator of The Arrow of Gold has considerable involvement in the story and is unnamed. The principal theme is a love triangle which comprises the young narrator, Doña Rita and the Confederate veteran Captain Blunt (named for Simon F. Blunt). Doña Rita finances the operations of the narrator's vessel, Tremolino, which smuggles ammunition to the Carlist army. Nautical operations are detailed in the Tremolino chapters of The Mirror of the Sea rather than in this novel.

Conrad dedicated the novel to his friend, the author, critic and journalist Richard Curle.

== See also ==
- Politics in fiction
- Third Carlist War
- Carlism
- Carlos, Duke of Madrid
- Tirso de Olazábal y Lardizábal
