= Quarterstaff =

Type of polearm

Quarterstaff fighting
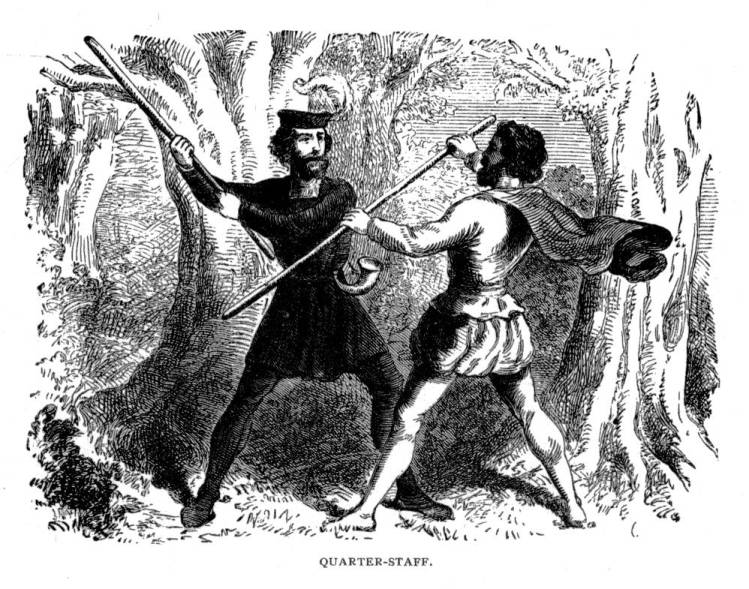
- Quarterstaves in use, from Old English Sports, Pastimes and Customs, published 1891
- Focus: Weaponry
- Country of origin: England
- Creator: unknown
- Olympic sport: No

A quarterstaff (plural quarterstaffs or quarterstaves), also short staff or simply staff is a traditional European polearm, which was especially prominent in England during the Early Modern period.

The term is generally accepted to refer to a shaft of hardwood from 6 to 9 feet (1.8 to 2.7 m) long, sometimes with a metal tip, ferrule, or spike at one or both ends. The term "short staff" compares this to the "long staff" based on the pike with a length in excess of 10 to 12 feet (3.0 to 3.7 m). The height of the staff should be around the same as the user plus their hand set upright on their head (approximately 8 inches (20 cm)).

== Etymology ==
The name "quarterstaff" is first attested in the mid-16th century. The "quarter" possibly refers to the means of production, the staff being made from quartersawn hardwood (as opposed to a staff of lower quality made from conventionally sawn lumber or from a tree branch). English longbows were traditionally made from staves of yew or ash that were split into quarters. If the longbow was not in use, the 'quarter stave' may have also been used as a weapon in the form of a staff. It is also possible that the name derives from the way the staff is held, the right hand grasping it one-quarter of the distance from the lower end, as suggested in the Encyclopædia Britannica. While this interpretation may have given rise to such positions in 19th-century manuals, it probably arose by popular etymology. The Oxford English Dictionary, in support of its explanation of the "quarter" in origin referring to the way the staff was made, points to an early attestation of the term, dated to 1590, "Plodding through Aldersgate, all armed as I was, with a quarter Ashe staffe on my shoulder."

George Silver, an English fencer who wrote two books (1599, 1605) including lengthy sections on staff fighting does not use the term "quarterstaff", but instead calls it a "short staff" (as opposed to the "long staff"). Joseph Swetnam, writing in 1615, distinguishes between the "quarterstaff" of 7 or 8 feet (2.1 or 2.4 m) in length and the "long staff" of 11 or 12 feet (3.4 or 3.7 m).

== History ==
The oldest surviving English work giving technical information on staff combat dates from the 15th century – it is a brief listing of "strokes of the 2-hand staff", which shares terminology with the preceding "strokes of the 2-hand sword" in the same manuscript. George Silver (1599) explains techniques of short-staff combat and states that the use of other polearms and the two-handed sword are based on the same method. Later authors on the subject included Joseph Swetnam, Zachary Wylde, and Donald McBane. Silver, Swetnam, and Wylde all agreed that the staff was among the best, if not the very best, of all hand weapons.

During the 16th century quarterstaves were favoured as weapons by the London Masters of Defence. Richard Peeke, in 1625, and Zachary Wylde, in 1711, refer to the quarterstaff as a national English weapon. By the 18th century the weapon became popularly associated with gladiatorial prize playing.

A modified version of quarterstaff fencing, employing bamboo or ash staves and protective equipment adapted from fencing, boxing, and cricket was revived as a sport in some London fencing schools and at the Aldershot Military Training School during the later 19th century. Works on this style were published by Thomas McCarthy and by Allanson-Winn and Phillips-Wolley.

An informal tradition (or sporadic series of revivals) based on the late 19th century style persisted in England throughout the early to mid 20th century, being particularly associated with military and fencing exhibitions and with the Boy Scout movement. The quarterstaff is also one of the main disciplines of stage combat taught by the Society of American Fight Directors, the British Academy of Stage and Screen Combat, and the British Academy of Dramatic Combat.

== Historical practice ==
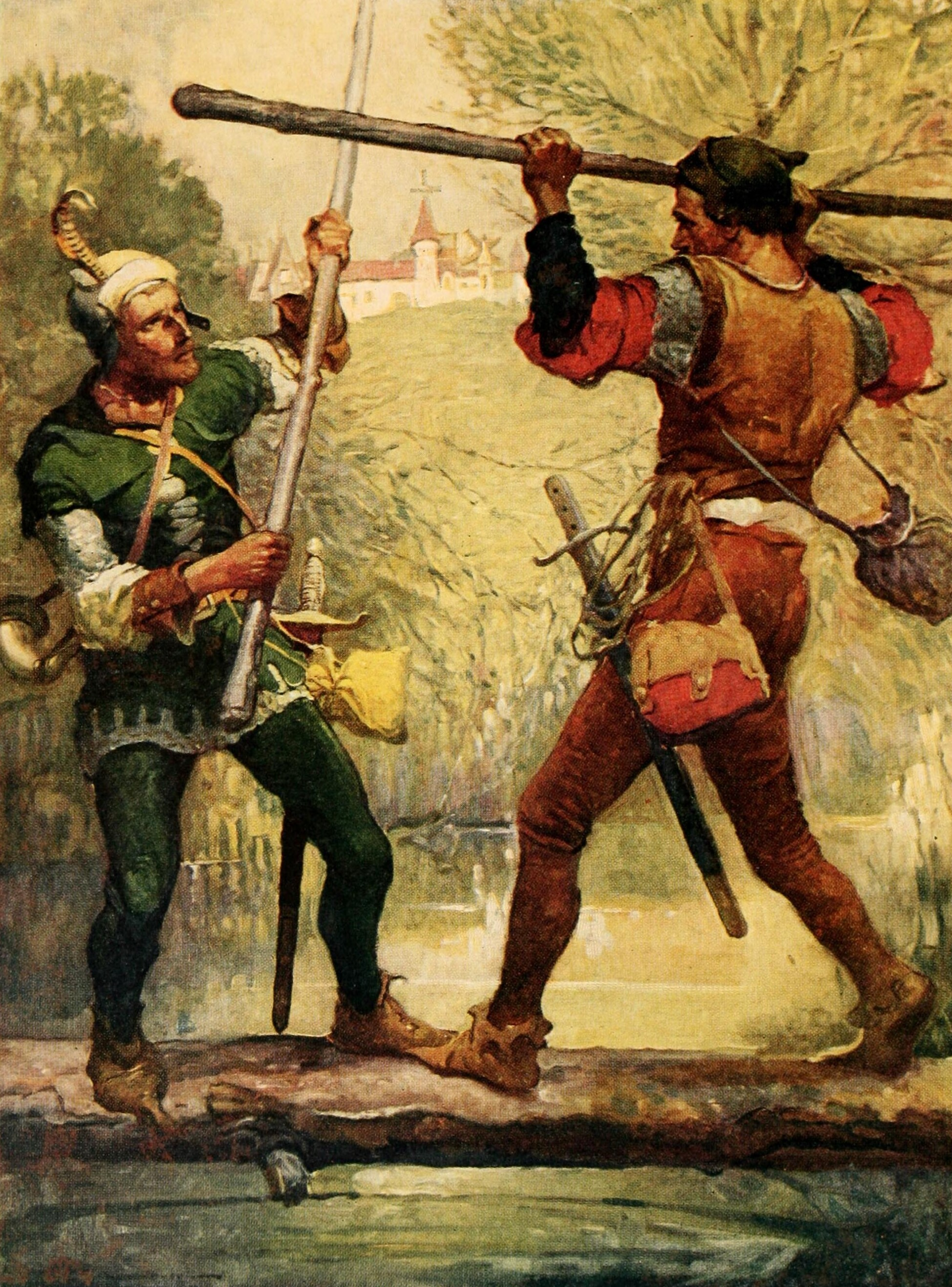
1921 illustration of Robin Hood and Little John fighting with quarterstaffs

Paulus Hector Mair in his martial arts compendium of the mid-16th century, details techniques of fighting with the staff in the German school of fencing of the Renaissance.

There is some variation as to the proper way to hold a quarterstaff. According to the 16th to 18th century writings of Silver, Swetnam and Wylde, the quarterstaff is held with the back hand at the butt end of the staff and the other hand about 1 to 1.5 feet (30 to 46 cm) above it. According to the 14th to 16th century writings of Johannes Liechtenauer and Paulus Hector Mair, the quarterstaff is held with the back hand a hand's breadth from the butt end of the staff, and the other hand up to the middle of the staff. This is likely because of the transition of techniques from quarterstaves to polearms in Mair's compendium.

Of these the low guard is considered the central guard. Blows were primarily delivered downwards either directly or at angles. Parries of blows to the legs were done either by lifting the leg away from the line of attack or by thrusting one end of the staff into the ground and releasing the foremost hand which was in danger of being struck. Thrusts (called "darts" by Wylde) were often performed with the release of the forward hand and a step with the forward leg like a fencing lunge, stretching forward the back hand as far as possible. Longer thrusts were delivered with a full step forward with the back leg accompanying the back hand. It was recommended that when delivering a blow that at the end of it the back leg and foot should be compassed about so as to fall roughly into a line with the front foot and the point of the weapon. The same circling round of the back leg was applied to parries also. Singularly among the three authors, Swetnam recommends preference of thrusting over striking. Silver and Wylde describe striking and thrusting as equally valid attacks.

The position with one hand held at the quarter and the other at the middle of the staff is not found in these early modern manuals, but it is described in the quarterstaff manuals published in the late 19th century, e.g. McCarthy (1883): "both hands should be 2.5 feet (76 cm) apart, and the same distance from each end".

The quarterstaff is also mentioned in England's legend of Robin Hood. In ballads and tales of the famed yeoman, the quarterstaff is often mentioned. For example, in "Robin Hood and the Tinker" and several other tales, the quarterstaff is the weapon in hand as the two engage in a duel, as the Tinker was apparently sent to bring Robin Hood to justice at the hands of the Sheriff of Nottingham. This implies that the quarterstaff was in use before and during the 16th to 18th centuries, as the tale of Robin Hood is mostly written of during that time frame.

== See also ==
- Stick fighting
- Bō
- Paulus Hector Mair
- Joseph Swetnam
- Johannes Liechtenauer
- George Silver
