= Combat in film =

Performances of fighting and large-scale battles

Cinematic fight choreography or staged fights in cinema include performances of archery, classical fencing, historical fencing, martial arts, close combat, and duels in general, as well as choreography of full-scale battles with hundreds of combatants.

== Asian martial arts ==
The 1970s in Hong Kong saw the rise and sudden death of international martial arts and film superstar Bruce Lee, who is known for popularizing Hong Kong action cinema. He was succeeded in the 1980s by Jackie Chan, who popularized the use of comedy and dangerous stunts in action films.

Hong Kong-based fight choreographer Yuen Wo-ping is famed for his work on Crouching Tiger, Hidden Dragon and the Matrix trilogy, in which the often unrealistic fighting techniques are complemented by directorial techniques such as bullet time. Ching Siu-tung is particularly noted in the field of Hong Kong action cinema for his use of graceful wire fu techniques.

Notable Asian martial arts choreographers:

- Yuen Wo-ping
- Ching Siu-tung
- Yoshio Sugino
- Bruce Lee
- Don Wilson
- Jackie Chan
- Yayan Ruhian
- Donnie Yen
- Sammo Hung
- Yuen Biao
- Panna Rittikrai
- Tony Jaa
- Dan Inosanto
- Corey Yuen
- Ji Chang-Wook
- Iko Uwais

Notable Asian martial arts actors:

- Bruce Lee
- Jackie Chan
- Donnie Yen
- Jet Li
- Ji Chang-Wook
- Tony Jaa
- Iko Uwais
- Yayan Ruhian
- Sammo Hung
- Yuen Biao
- Don The Dragon Wilson
- Michelle Yeoh

=== Awards ===
- Golden Horse Award for Best Action Choreography
- Hong Kong Film Award for Best Action Choreography

== Fencing ==
Cinema inherited the concept of choreographed fights directly from the theatrical fight. Films that feature notable classical fencing scenes include:

- The Mark of Zorro (1920)
- The Three Musketeers (1921)
- Don Q, Son of Zorro (1925)
- The Black Pirate (1926)
- The Iron Mask (1929)
- Captain Blood (1935)
- The Prisoner of Zenda (1937)
- The Adventures of Robin Hood (1938)
- The Sea Hawk (1940)
- The Mark of Zorro (1940)
- The Corsican Brothers (1941)
- The Black Swan (1942)
- Adventures of Don Juan (1948)
- Cyrano de Bergerac (1950)
- Scaramouche (1952)
- At Sword's Point (1952)
- The Court Jester (1956)
- Le Bossu (1959)
- Le Miracle des loups (1961)
- The Great Race (1965)
- The Three Musketeers (1973)
- The Four Musketeers (1974)
- The Duellists (1977)
- The Princess Bride (1987)
- Cyrano de Bergerac (1990)
- Robin Hood: Prince of Thieves (1991)
- By the Sword (1991)
- The Fencing Master (1992)
- Rob Roy (1995)
- On Guard (1997)
- The Mask of Zorro (1998)
- The Count of Monte Cristo (2002)
- Die Another Day (2002)
- Pirates of the Caribbean: The Curse of the Black Pearl (2003)

Douglas Fairbanks in 1920 was the first film director to ask a fencing master to assist the production of a fencing scene in cinema. A second wave of swashbuckling films was triggered with Errol Flynn from 1935. Also notable in the early period were Ramon Novarro, Rudolph Valentino, and John Barrymore. Fencing masters (fight arrangers) from the time include Henry Uttenhove, Fred Cavens, Ralph Faulkner, Jean Heremans, Bob Anderson, William Hobbs, and Claude Carliez.

Renewed interest in swashbuckling films arose in the 1970s, in the wake of The Three Musketeers (1973). Directors at this stage aimed for a certain amount of historical accuracy, although, as the 2007 Encyclopædia Britannica puts it, "movie fencing remains a poor representation of actual fencing technique". A notable fight arranger of this period is William Hobbs.

== Knife fights ==
Knife fights, as well as knife-throwing stunts, are staged for dramatic effect in action films. In Under Siege, Commando, Gangs of New York, Machete, and Machete Kills, knife fights are shown as climactic battles. A common theme in such films is for the hero to discard a gun or similarly superior weapon, in order to engage the otherwise unarmed villain in "fair" knife-to-knife combat. In the 2002 film version of The Count of Monte Cristo, the main character, Dantes, agrees to engage in a knife fight against Jacopo, a member of a smuggler's crew (the captain of which calls Jacopo "the best knife fighter I have ever seen"). Dantes defeats Jacopo but spares his life, gaining a pivotal ally in his future endeavors.

One of the most famous cinematic knife fights occurs in From Here to Eternity. The scene—occurring in a back alley—is stark and realistic, lacks background music and uses pitch black shadow.

In the movie Force 10 from Navarone, a knife fight appeared between Sgt. Weaver, an African-American medic Soldier, played by Carl Weathers, and Capt. Drazak, an officer of the Chetniks, allies to Nazi Germany, played by Richard Kiel. The fight ended with Drazak's death.

In the film Commando, starring Arnold Schwarzenegger, there is a knife fight at the end of the movie between John Matrix (Arnold Schwarzenegger) and Bennett played by Vernon Wells. They begin with the knife, and then end up in a No-holds-barred CQC.

In the film Cobra, starring Sylvester Stallone as a city cop who must stop a knife using serial killer and cult member the Night Slasher played by Brian Thompson. There is a fight scene at the end involving a knife fight between Stallone's character Cobra and the Night Slasher. The menacing looking knife used by the Night Slasher is a brass knuckles or more like a spiked knuckles, modern version of a trench knife.

The film Eastern Promises has a rather intense knife fight that rivals that of the also psychologically disturbing knife fight scene from Saving Private Ryan.

In The Bourne Identity (2002 film), Jason Bourne (played by Matt Damon) had a knife-fight encounter with Castel, an assassin sent to kill him. In the struggle, Jason Bourne equalizes his unarmed position against the assassin's knife by arming himself with a pen.

In Kill Bill, a knife-fight occurs between the Bride and Vernita Green, during which the pair severely damage Green's living room, only to abruptly halt when Green's daughter is dropped off by the school bus and seen walking towards the house. Shortly thereafter, Green sneakily pulls a gun, and the Bride responds by throwing her knife, to deadly effect.

The Hunted (2003, William Friedkin) was a unique film that put an emphasis on showing knife combat. Starring Benicio del Toro and Tommy Lee Jones, each character has a special affinity for knives, due to participating in various special operations missions under military service, which required use of a knife as a primary weapon. The knife combat portrayed in the film is based on the Filipino weapons-based martial art called Sayoc Kali. Also Friedkin's Bug (2007) features a knife-fight.

A Grande Arte (1991) along with the above-mentioned The Hunted, is one of the rare films to focus on knife combat and features training scenes as well.

Dune (1984, David Lynch) and the 2000 Dune miniseries, based on Frank Herbert´s bestselling science fiction novel Dune, show a world where a corporeal shield (a force-field projector) makes laser and projectile weapons useless. Because of that, wars and duels are settled by knife-fighting, which is altered by the presence of the shield: a fast-moving knife bounces off the shield; a slow-moving knife can penetrate the shield to reach a vital organ. The climactic duel, between Paul Muad´dib and Feyd-Rautha, used only knives (no shields) and martial-arts abilities.

Michael Jackson's music video Beat it features a highly stylized depiction of two men knife-fighting using switchblade knives, with their wrists tied. This is reminiscent of a similar depiction in West Side Story.

In Quantum of Solace (2008) James Bond (Daniel Craig) enters the apartment of Edmund Slate, the man he was sent to investigate. Slate comes out of nowhere and tries to kill him with a switchblade. They struggle, Bond arms himself with scissors, disarms Slate by bending his wrist forward, and stabs him in the neck and femoral artery, causing Slate to bleed to death.

In The Expendables, Lee Christmas (played by Jason Statham) frequently makes use of combat knives when he is not in possession of a firearm and uses them both as projectiles and in hand-to-hand combat. Gunner (Dolph Lundgren) also uses a large bowie knife but gives it to Lee at the beginning of the film.

In The Expendables 2, Lee Christmas again makes use of combat knives. He is shown to be skillful enough to defeat a squad of enemies on his own, as well as challenge the villain Hector (played by Scott Adkins), himself a formidable knife-fighter. Hector pulls his knife on Christmas when the latter runs out of blades; he arms himself with a pair of brass knuckles, with which he fights and defeats Hector.

In The Man From Nowhere, Cha Tae-Shik (played by Won Bin) makes use of a switchblade and the art form kali to combat gangsters in a large condominium towards the finale of the film. After defeating the gangsters, he fights their hired assassin who also wields a karambit. Both fighters fight close quarters until Cha Tae-Shik gains the upper hand and stabs the hired assassin in the heart.

In The Avengers, Hawkeye (played by Jeremy Renner) fights Black Widow (played by Scarlett Johansson) while under the influence of Loki. When deprived of his bow, Hawkeye draws his knife and continues the fight until he is disarmed and incapacitated.

In Captain America: The Winter Soldier, during the first encounter between Steve Rogers (played by Chris Evans and the titular antagonist (played by Sebastian Stan), the Winter Soldier uses multiple knives against Rogers in their melee along with various firearms.

In The Birth of a Nation (2016 film), the film provided various hand-to-hand close combat and knife combat techniques in a climactic “last stand” battle scene, showing Nat Turner (played by Nate Parker) and his group of slave rebels facing the militia and plantation defenders at an armory.

In the 2011 Indonesian action film The Raid, the protagonist Rama (Iko Uwais) wields a knife to defeat multiple adversaries using the martial art Pencak Silat. In the 2014 sequel, Rama has a climactic knife fight with an assassin using karambits, a traditional Indo-Malay curved knife.

== Historical martial arts ==
Historical martial arts reconstruction developed in the later 20th century and became influential in cinema only from ca. the 1990s. Earlier sequences of combat with pre-Renaissance weaponry were typically based on classical fencing techniques, or choreographed as ad-hoc "blade whacking".

Influential movie heralding renewed interest in pre-modern swordsmanship were Excalibur (1981) and Highlander (1986). Lightsaber combat in the Star Wars films takes some elements from kendo, and The Lord of the Rings employs some elements of historical fencing.

Historical drama films that feature combat based on historical swordsmanship include Rob Roy (1995), Gladiator (2000), Troy (2004), Kingdom of Heaven (2005), Alatriste (2006).

A Knight's Tale is an example of a movie that includes jousting performances (2001) and unrealistic clashing of swords on armor, despite the Fechtbücher who show armoured combat (Harnischfechten).
