= British Academy of Dramatic Combat =

British Dramatic Combat training organisation

The British Academy of Dramatic Combat
- The British Academy Of Dramatic Combat (BADC) logo
- Abbreviation: BADC
- Predecessor: Society of British Fight Directors
- Formation: 1969
- Type: Academy
- Purpose: British organisation that provides training in stage combat and certifies Actor Combatants, Dramatic Combat Teachers and Examiners
- Location: London, United Kingdom
- Key people: Master At Arms: Rachel Bown-Williams; Ruth Cooper-Brown; Nicholas Hall; Jonathan Howell; Jessica Hrabowsky; Gordon Kemp; Tim Klotz; Marcello Marascalchi; Kevin Rowntree; Senior Teachers: Kenan Ali; Rachel Bown-Williams; Ruth Cooper-Brown; Lawrence Carmichael; Bethan Clark; Nicholas Hall; Craig Hamblyn; Jonathan Howell; Jessica Hrabowsky; Gordon Kemp; Tim Klotz; Haruka Kuroda; Claire Llewellyn; Marcello Marascalchi; Nathaniel Marten; Kiel O'Shea; James Reid; Kevin Rowntree; Rachid Sbitri; Dan Styles; Neil Tattersall; Andrew Young; Certified Teachers: Katherine Aldridge; Tiffany Antoniuk; Lloyd Caldwell; Lyndall Grant; Carlotta de Gregori; Philip Harris; Richard Hay; Robin Hellier; Ian McCracken; Dave Nolan; Minna Paija; Jean-Marc Perret; Michael Poynor; Stephen Louis; Charlotte Price; Andy King; Russell Eccleston; Stefan Ruiz; Hadley Smith
- Website: badc.org.uk

The British Academy of Dramatic Combat (BADC) is an organisation that provides training in stage combat and certifies Actor Combatants, Dramatic Combat Teachers and Examiners.

== History ==
In February 1969, Henry Marshall, Master at Arms of the Royal Academy of Dramatic Art, and William Hobbs, who was then the Fight Director at the Royal National Theatre, convened a meeting of professionals who regularly engaged in directing fights in the British theatre, as well as people who regularly taught at drama schools that offered dramatic combat. The result of this meeting was the formation of a body of practitioners dedicated to the development of Dramatic Combat as a professional discipline, called the Society of British Fight Directors (SBFD).

The founding members of that small society were: Henry Marshall; William Hobbs; Charles Alexis; B. H. Barry; John Barton; Roy Goodall; John Greenwood; Ian McKay; Bryan Mosley; Derek Ware; Arthur Wise; Philip Anthony; Patrick Crean; Hans Mater and John Waller.

The SBFD became an inspiration and model leading to the formation of other international Dramatic Combat societies, including The Society of American Fight Directors.

In 1996, 27 years after the foundation of the Society of British Fight Directors, the society voted to change its name to The British Academy of Dramatic Combat (BADC).

== Today ==
The BADC has developed structured training schemes which allow progression within the academy from basic Actor Combatant to Advanced level, from Apprentice Teacher to Master At Arms as well as the assessment and training of Examiners.

Many BADC members are pioneers of the art of dramatic combat and champion its importance in Theatre, Film, TV and Motion Capture. Their work in dramatic combat is combined with and develops alongside related disciplines, for example Intimacy Directing.

== Certifications ==
Certified Fight Teachers provide Actor Combatant training either at institutions such as drama school and universities or through their own companies. Three times a year the BADC also runs a one-day workshop for its membership.

Upcoming workshops and courses can be found on the BADC website.

All individual BADC weapon certifications are valid for 4 years.
