= Stage combat =

Technique used in theatre to create the illusion of physical combat

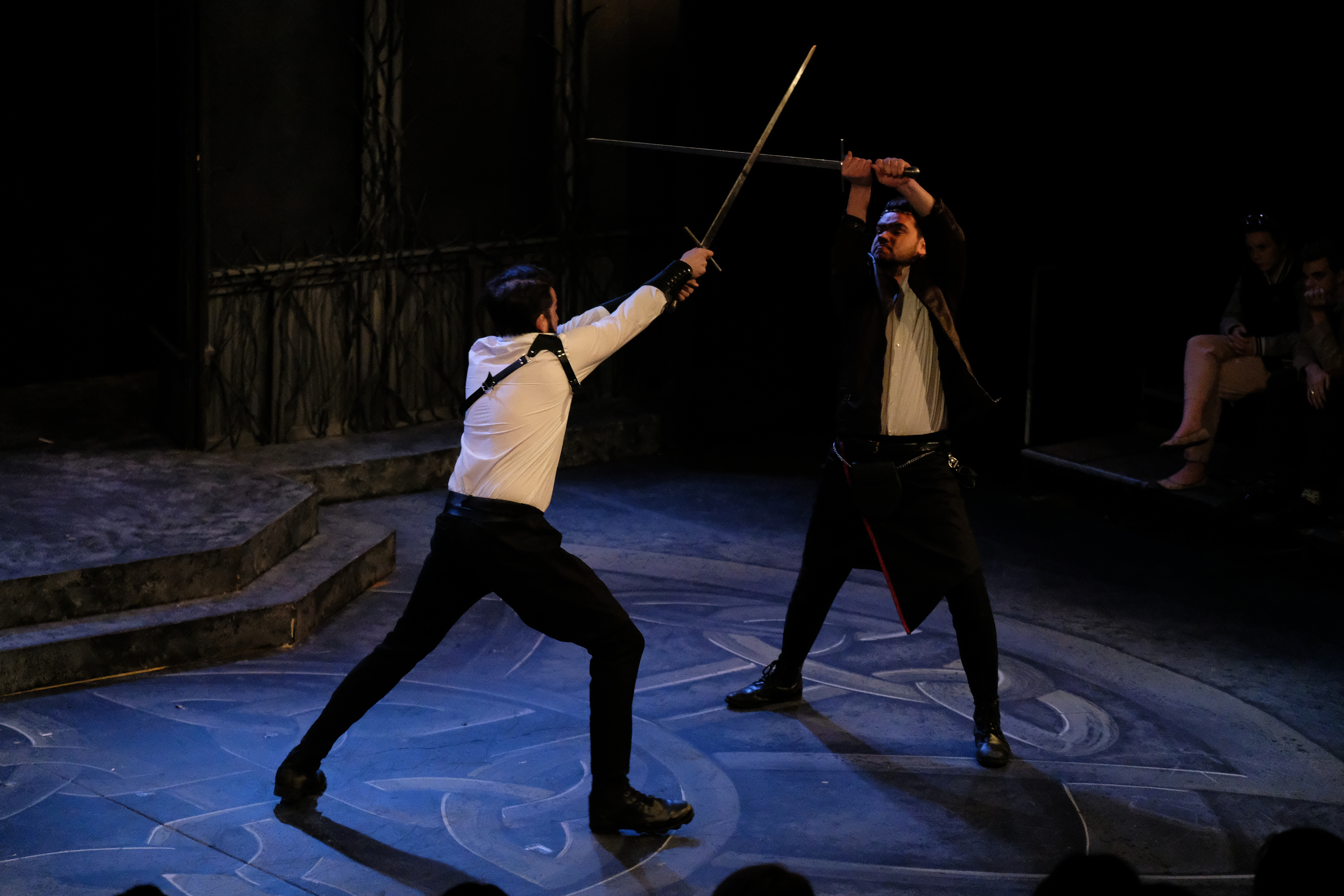
A swordfight from a stage production of Macbeth

Stage combat, fight craft or fight choreography is a specialised technique in theatre designed to create the illusion of physical combat without causing harm to the performers. It is employed in live stage plays as well as operatic and ballet productions. With the advent of cinema and television the term has widened to also include the choreography of filmed fighting sequences, as opposed to the earlier live performances on stage. It is closely related to the practice of stunts and is a common field of study for actors. Actors famous for their stage fighting skills frequently have backgrounds in dance, gymnastics or martial arts training.

== History ==
=== Ancient ===
The history of stage fighting and mock combat can be traced to antiquity, with Aristotle quoted as noting that tragedy is conflict between people or indeed it may be traced to the origins of the human species and primate display behaviour. Display of martial aptitude is a natural occurrence in warrior societies, and ritualized forms of mock combat often evolve into war dances. Whether it is the struggle between the men and women of Aristophanes' Lysistrata in Ancient Greece or Ancient Egypt where Herodotus in his Histories talks about a religious festival in which they beat each other with staves but no one dies, staged combat has always existed. As it doesn't make sense to sacrifice citizens in rituals, many ancient civilizations turned to symbolic gestures of combat through dancing or bringing a weapon to someone's throat or neck without actually touching them to symbolize death or an act of violence.

=== Post-classical ===
Fights staged for entertainment may also be in earnest for the combatants, as was the case with the Roman gladiators, and any public duel, such as the judicial duel of the European Middle Ages. The medieval tournament and joust are a classical examples of competitive ritualised mock combat. The joust from the time of Maximilian I developed into a sport with enormous cost involved for each knight and correspondingly high prestige attached, comparable to contemporary Formula One races, while at the same time minimizing the danger of injury with highly specialized equipment.

In the Late Middle Ages, staged fencing bouts, with or without choreography, became popular with fencing schools. Some German fechtbuch ("combat manuals", literally 'fight' or 'fence book') have sections dedicated to flamboyant techniques to be employed in such Klopffechten ("knockabout fighting"), which would be impractical in serious combat, and the Late Medieval German masters distinguish mock fights (fechten zu schimpf, 'rant fighting') and real combat (fechten zu ernst, 'earnest fighting').

The history of European theatrical combat has its roots in medieval theatre, and becomes tangible in Elizabethan drama. Richard Tarlton, who was a member of both William Shakespeare's acting company and of the London Masters of Defence weapons guild, was among the first fight directors in the modern sense. Sword duels depicted in plays showed how popular the pastime was in actual life. Before 1615 in England, many plays featured duels and the duels were regarded as highlights of the show. As opposed to after 1615, when dueling was publicly condemned by King James and the duels were used as a last resort in regard to the plot.

=== Modern ===
During the late 17th and early 18th centuries, stylized stage combat has been a staple feature of traditional performing arts for centuries, such as in Japanese Kabuki theater (as tachimawari "fighting scenes"), Chinese Beijing Opera and Indian theater.

Fencing masters in Europe began to research and experiment with historical fencing techniques, with weapons such as the two-handed sword, rapier and smallsword, and to instruct actors in their use. Notable amongst these were George Dubois, a Parisian fight director and martial artist who created performance fencing styles based on gladiatorial combat as well as Renaissance rapier and dagger fencing. Egerton Castle and Captain Alfred Hutton of London were also involved both in reviving antique fencing systems and in teaching these styles to actors.

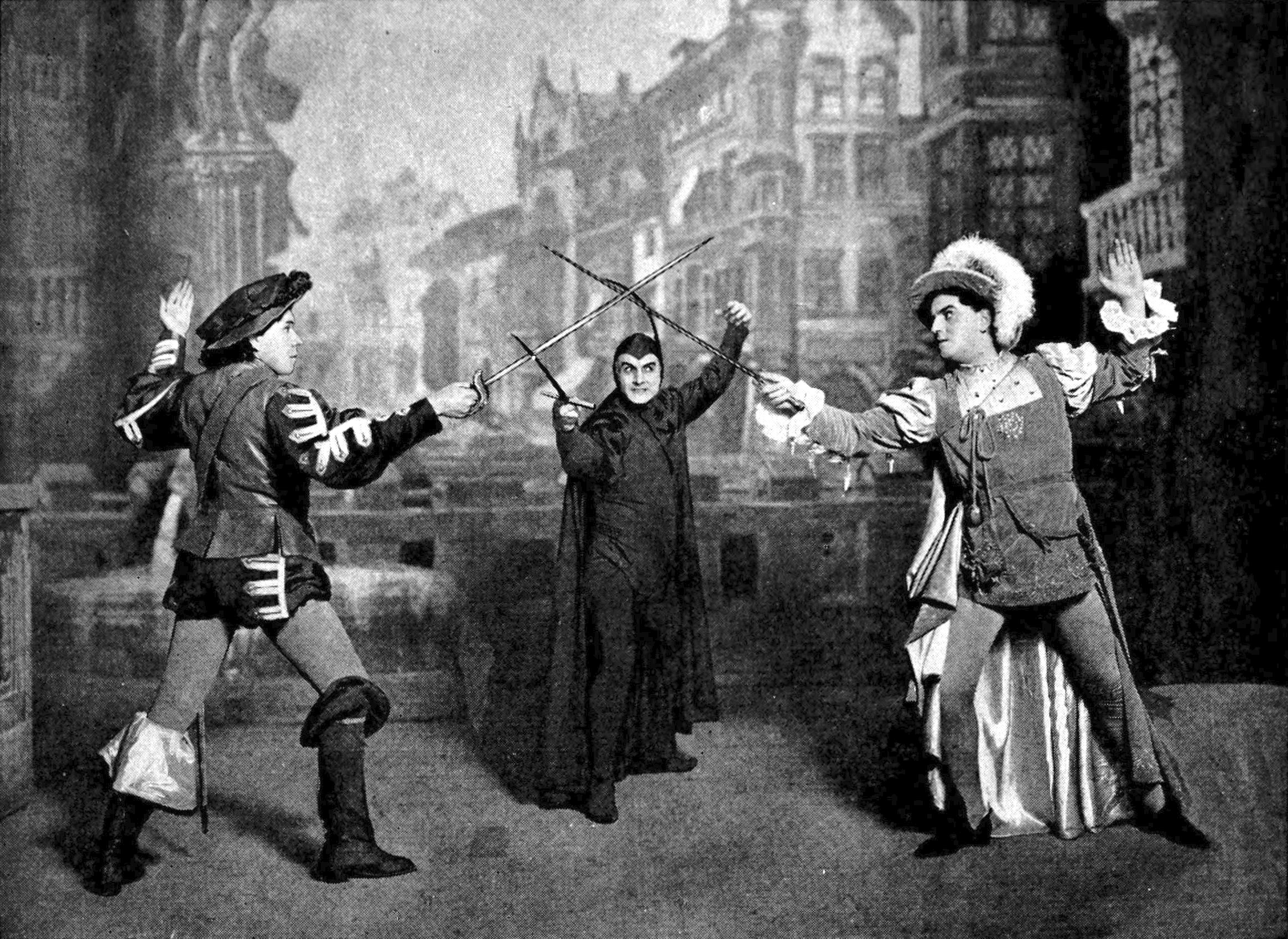
The beginning of a staged duel from Act IV of Gounod's Faust

During the late 19th and early 20th centuries, scenes of swordplay in touring theatrical productions throughout Europe, the British Commonwealth and the United States were typically created by combining several widely known, generic routines known as "standard combats", identified by names such as the "Round Eights" and the "Glasgow Tens".

Cinematic fencing has its roots in the 1920s, with the movies of Douglas Fairbanks. One of the more celebrated fight directors who emerged in this time was Paddy Crean who revolutionized stage combat, specifically sword play, for the silver screen and theater. Paddy created the flamboyant style of sword play that can be seen in Errol Flynn movies, among others. He promoted the use of safety above all things and then focused on story of the fight. B. H. Barry and J. Allen Suddeth, students of Paddy Crean, are two fight masters who have continued developing Paddy's legacy. Barry helped found the Society of British Fight Directors, later to become the British Academy of Dramatic Combat (BADC) and then came to the United States to give fight direction a more specific shape. J. Allen Suddeth founded the National Fight Directors Training Program in the United States and wrote the book "Fight Direction for the Theater" (1996). Martial arts movies emerge as a distinct genre from the 1940s, popularized by Bruce Lee and Sonny Chiba from the 1960s.

Starting in the mid-1960s, John Waller, a pioneer in the English historical European martial arts (HEMA) revival, was a fight director for stage and screen, and later a teacher of stage combat at London drama schools, with an emphasis on historical realism. Informal guilds of fight choreographers began to take shape in the 1970s with the establishment of The Society of British Fight Directors, 1969 to 1996. Training was established in the United States with the formation of the Society of American Fight Directors in 1977.

Following this, further academies and associations worldwide have been established to uphold the craft, training and quality of work in the art-form of stage combat nationally and internationally, including: The British Academy Of Stage & Screen Combat (BASSC) and Fight Directors Canada (FDC) in 1993; the Society of Australian Fight Directors Inc. (SAFDi) in 1994; the Nordic Stage Fight Society (NSFS) and the New Zealand Stage Combat Society in 1995; the British Academy of Dramatic Combat (BADC, formerly known as The Society of British Fight Directors) in 1996; Art of Combat in 1997; New York Combat for Stage & Screen in 1999; Stage Combat Deutschland in 2004; and the Australian Stage Combat Association (ASCA) in 2010; The British Guild of Stage Combat in 2015. As of 2005, East 15 Acting School, London offered a B.A. (Hons) Degree in Acting & Stage Combat. Many of the societies offer certification programs for different weapons, which is used as an indicator about how much training an actor has had. During the early part of the Covid 19 Pandemic, several organizations made strides in distance/virtual training, including international virtual workshops.

== Techniques ==
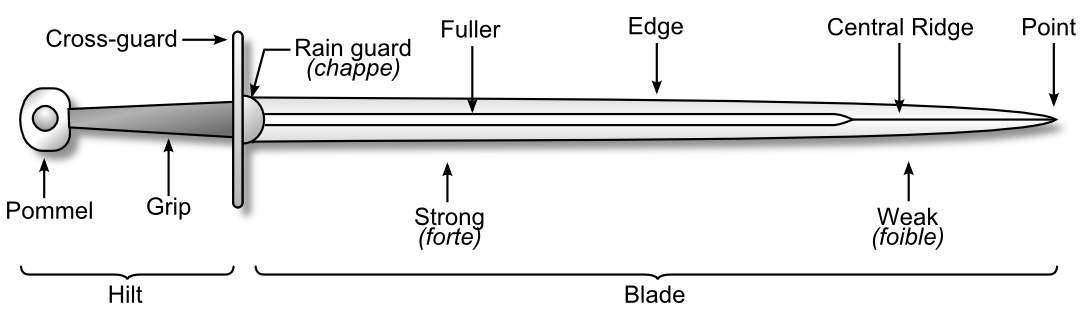
The parts of a sword

Stage combat training includes unarmed combat skills such as illusory slaps, punches, kicks, throwing and holding techniques; theatrical adaptations of various forms of fencing such as rapier and dagger, smallsword and broadsword, as well as the use of other weapons, notably the quarterstaff and knives; and more specialized skills such as professional wrestling and different styles of martial arts. However, stage combat can include any form of choreographed violence and the options are limited only by safety concerns, and the ability of the participants involved. As a note, most of these techniques are drawn from actual fighting techniques, but modified to be safer for actors. For example, although there are a number of ways of creating the safe illusion of a slap to the face (which is obviously something that could really be done in combat), none of these involve making actual contact with the victim's face.

The overriding concern is for the safety of the actors and audience. This requirement has led to the adaptation of many standard martial arts and fencing skills specifically for performance. For example, many basic sword attacks and parries must be modified to ensure that the actors do not bring the points of their weapons past their partner's face or otherwise inadvertently risk the other actor's health and well-being. Attacking actions in stage combat are extended past the performance partner's body, or aimed short of their apparent targets. Likewise, whereas their characters may be engaged in vicious unarmed combat, the actors must operate at a high level of complicity and communication to ensure a safe, exciting fight scene. In many forms of stage combat, distance is a key factor in technique. Many attacks are performed 'out of distance' so that there is no possible chance of one performer accidentally striking the other. Considerable professional judgement is called upon to determine what technical level may be appropriate for a given performer, taking into account allotted rehearsal time, and the expectations of the director.

Another important element of stage combat is sound. Sound increases the believability of an action for the audience. There are two kinds of sounds that can be made. One is vocal reactions. By adding a gasp, groan, or grunt when struck, the combatants make the moves come to life. The other kind of sound is a knap or a percussive sound made by hitting a resonant part of the body. This is timed to the moment an impact would happen and is staged so it is hidden from the audience. This allows the audience to believe that an actual blow or slap has landed because they hear a corresponding sound and see a reaction.

The combat phase of a play rehearsal is referred to as a fight rehearsal. Choreography is typically learned step by step, and practiced at first very slowly before increasing to a speed that is both dramatically convincing and safe for the performers and their audience. Even stage combat is risky, and it is preferable for actors to have as much training and experience as possible. A "fight call" or a brief rehearsal before the show is performed each time, set aside for the actors to "mark" through the fight to increase their muscle memory. A show which involves fight choreography will typically be trained and supervised by a professional fight choreographer and may also include a fight captain, who runs fight calls and ensures that actors are remaining safe throughout the duration of the show.

The fighting styles in movies set in the Medieval or Renaissance periods may be unrealistic and historically inaccurate. Most fight choreographers use a mix between Asian martial arts and sports fencing to re-enact fight scenes. This is generally due to the look of the fighting asked for by the director. If the director wants the story to flow a certain way, then the fight director will choreograph the fights to fit that style and tell the story.

== Weapons ==
For stage combat, all edges should be dulled and points blunted so that there is no risk of severe injury if someone is accidentally stabbed. In addition, weapons that are used, and not just for show, should be certified as combat-ready, thereby preventing any accidents involving blades accidentally breaking off.

The first known gallery exhibition of stage weaponry, Clashing Steel: The Art of Stage Combat, took place in July-September 2025 at Culture Lab LIC. The curators were Meron Langsner, Edjo Wheeler, and Jesse Belsky.

=== Melee ===
Melee weapons are used in large battle scenes and can include spears, axes, maces, flails, and more. These are other weapons that are best used in large playing spaces where there is room to work at a safe distance.

==== Stick-fighting ====
Quarterstaffs are used in shows that are performed in large playing spaces due to the large size of the weapon. One of the most popular quarterstaff fights is that between Robin Hood and Little John in the tale of Robin Hood from the 17th century ballad. Modern quarterstaff choreography has also integrated the techniques of the bō staff from the Japanese martial art Tenshin Shōden Katori Shintō-ryū, which originated around 1447. Examples of this style can be seen in the famous Kabuki play Yoshitsune Senbon Zakura, written in 1748.

==== Asian martial arts ====
Replicating Asian martial arts on stage is often an imitation of their cinematic representation, and often involves creating the illusion of high level skills that the performers themselves do not possess. Often, they are choreographed with stylized movements that are inspired by Asian martial arts cinema more so than actual martial practices.

The Vampire Cowboys Theatre Company, helmed by Qui Nguyen and Robert Ross Parker, have built a genre in part around the staging of elaborate martial arts derived fight scenes.

Lanford Wilson's play Burn This also includes a fight scene scripted to include elements of Aikido and Karate. While the play itself is not focused on martial arts, their inclusion is important in a pivotal moment of the play. An example of martial arts being centered in a scene of musical theatre can be found in Stephen Sondheim's Company (musical), during the song "The Little Things You Do Together." They also appear in some of the works of David Henry Hwang.

Pan Asian Rep produced Shogun MacBeth twice, which transposed Shakespeare's play to feudal Japan, with the appropriate style of swordplay. Also adapting the same play to a Japanese setting, Ping Chong created a stage version of Kurosawa's Throne of Blood.

In terms of Asian theatre, fight scenes in genres such as Kabuki are often highly stylized.

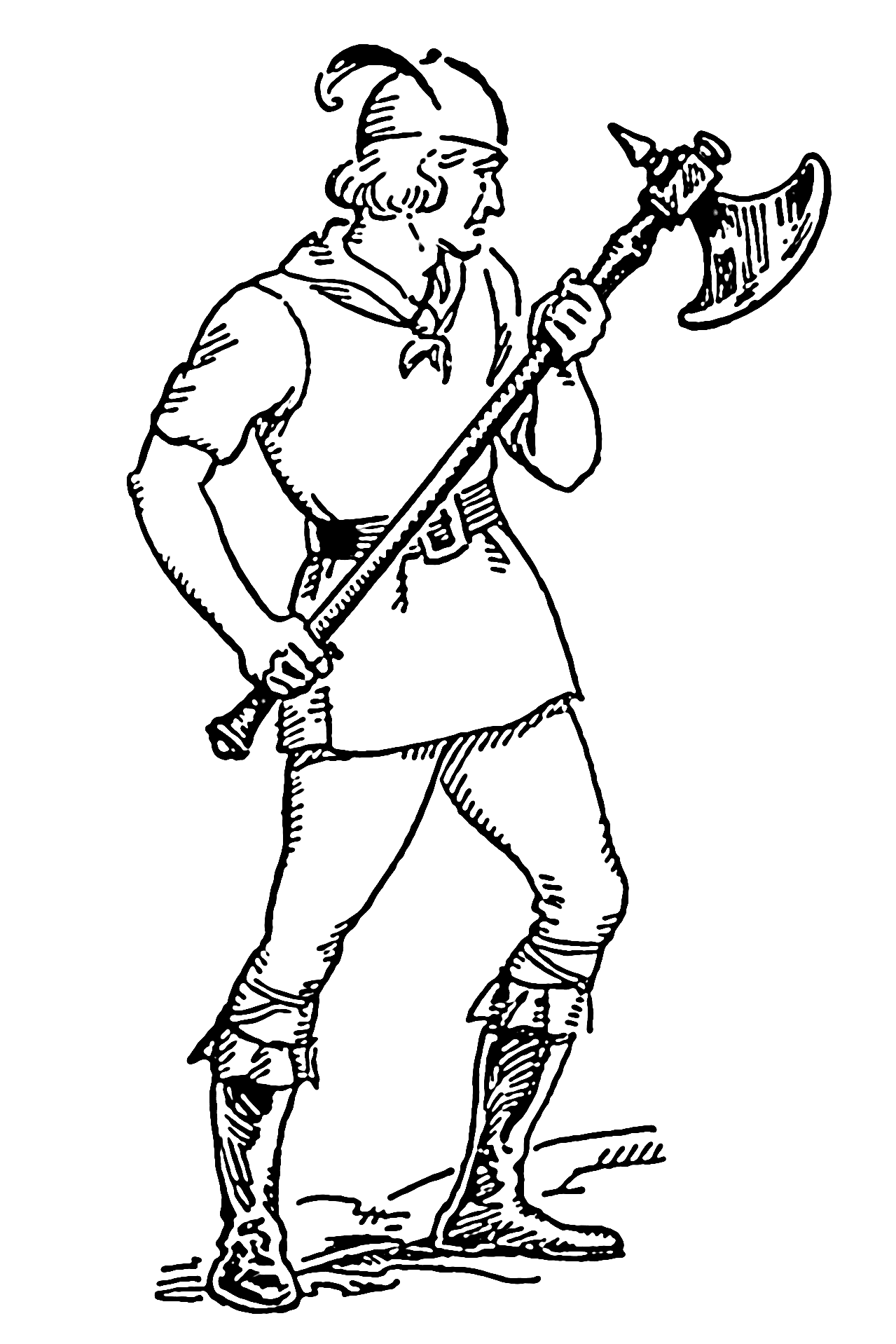
Example of a battle axe

==== European ====
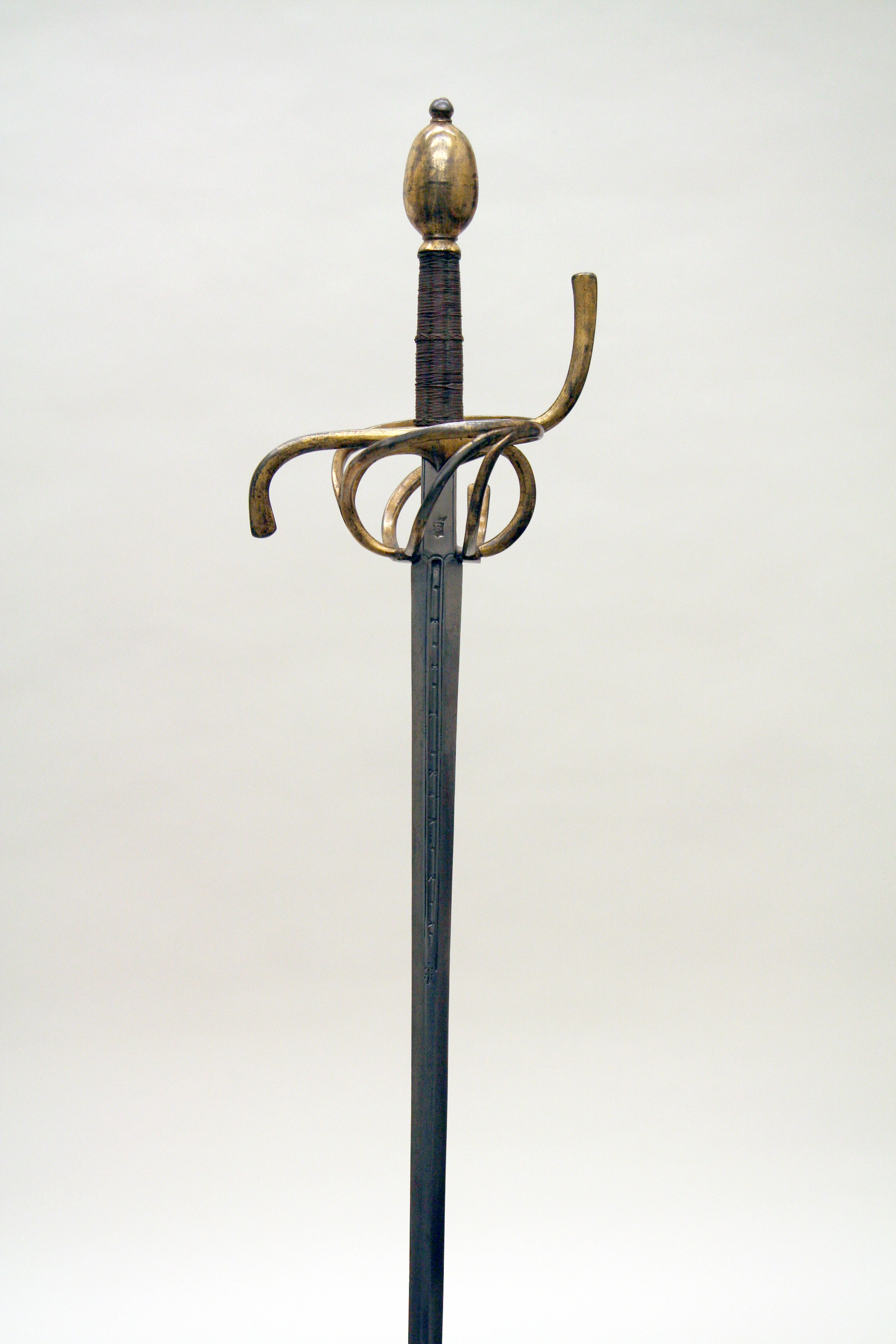
Rapier sword

A large sword commonly used in the early Middle Ages in Europe, the broadsword was notable for its large hilt which allowed it to be wielded with both hands due to its size and weight. Used for slashing rather than stabbing, this weapon is used in plays set in this period like Shakespeare's Macbeth and is also seen in fantasy epics like Lord of the Rings.

The first school instructing on the correct use of the rapier in England was started in 1576 by Rocco Bonetti from Italy. Bonetti took over the lease from playwright John Lyly to open his school in Blackfriars. The rapier has the advantage of the thrust over the slash which means it could be a much smaller and lighter weapon than the broadsword. It is popular in Shakespeare plays like Romeo and Juliet and Hamlet where duels are performed and can be used in combination with a dagger.

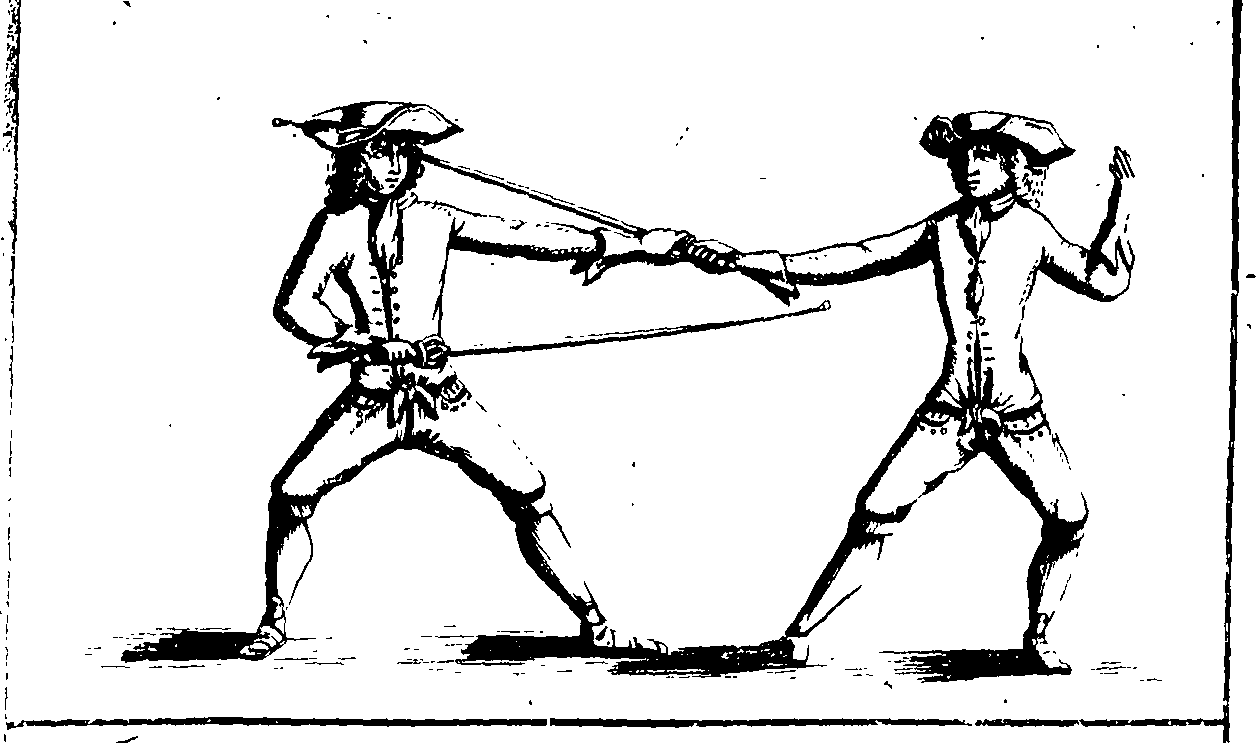
Two men dueling using the smallsword

The smallsword came into fashion in England and France in the late seventeenth century. It was used as a thrusting weapon and so sword movements were kept minimal to find the opening that a thrust could land. Most men of the period carried smallswords as fashion accessories so most were elegantly ornamented. An example of a smallsword duel can be seen in Les Liaisons Dangereuses by Christopher Hampton written in 1985, based on the 1782 novel of the same name.

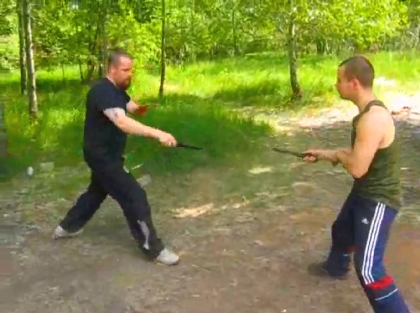
Two opponents face off in a knife fighting rehearsal.

There are many knife fighting styles from the Bowie knife to a switchblade. Knife fights tend to have quick sharp movements. An example of this can be seen in West Side Story's fight between Riff and Bernardo. Often in plays however, it is one actor with a knife against someone who is unarmed like in Act I of Georges Bizet's opera Carmen, written in 1875.

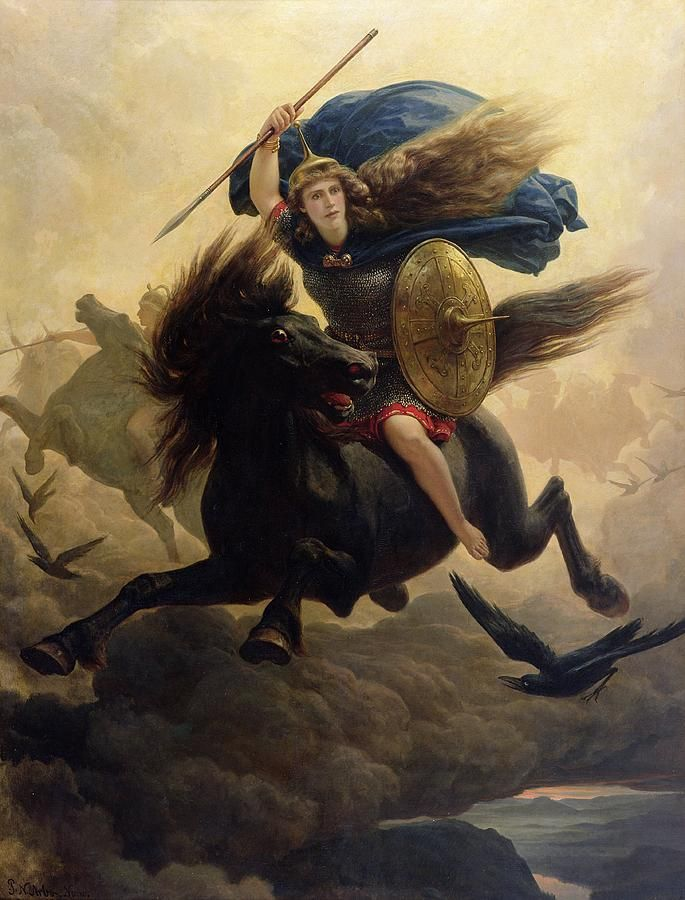
Approximate size and shape of shield used in stage combat

The Sword and shields used in stage combat are commonly round and are strong enough that they can be used as a defensive and offensive weapon. An important element in using a shield is to hold the shield arm in an upper diagonal so the fist is higher than the elbow so the top of the shield does not move when struck, and the danger being hit in the face with the shield or the weapon using to strike it can be avoided. Sword and shields can be found in battle scenes like in Shakespeare's Wars of the Roses history plays.

=== Guns ===
A staple of modern action films due to its visual spectacle, a result of often impressive choreography and stuntwork.

=== Bodies and bottles ===
This consists of hand to hand combat without weapon. Elements of unarmed combat include slaps, punches, kicks, grabs, chokes, falls, rolls, grappling, among others. Many fight directors rely on combinations of messy street fighting and martial arts such as aikido and Brazilian jiu-jitsu to create fights of this nature. Generally more common in modern contemporary plays, after swords have gone out of style but also seen in older plays such as Shakespeare's Othello when Othello strangles Desdemona.

Found objects are objects that are not traditionally weapons but can be used so in the context of the scene. A classic example of this is breaking a bottle over someone's head. As with all stage combat, the objects are rigged so as not to actually pose any danger to the recipients. In the case of bottles or plates, sugar glass molds are used rather than actual glass bottles.

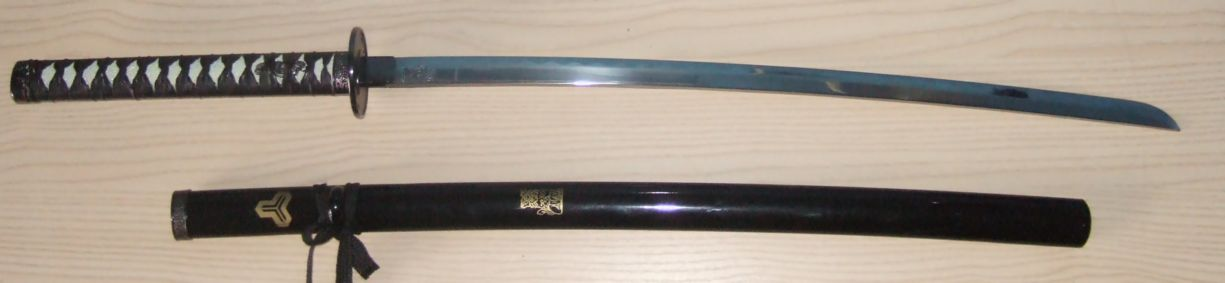
Example of a katana

== Realism ==
Fight choreography can vary widely from true realism to outright fantasy depending upon the requirements of a particular production. One of the biggest reasons that theatrical fight directors often do not aim for strict realism is that the live audience could not easily follow the 'story' of the action if bodies and blades were moving in the ways trained fighters would move them. For example, a production of Cyrano de Bergerac, by Edmond Rostand, using 17th-century rapiers, might show Cyrano making many circular cut attacks. But a more efficient, practical attack would be taking a quicker, more direct line to the opponent's body. But the fight director knows that the audience couldn't follow the action as well if the attacks were faster (the audience might hardly be able to see the thin blades whip through the air), so most fight choreographers would make choices to help the audience follow the story. Of course, this is dependent on the production, the director and other stylistic choices.

One school of fight choreographer thought says that an unusual aspect of live stage combat, such as in a play, is that audiences will react negatively to even simulated violence if they fear the actors are being harmed: for example, if an actor is really slapped in the face, the audience will stop thinking about the character and, instead, worry about the performer. Audiences may also fear for their own safety if large combat scenes seem to be out of control. Therefore, stage combat is not simply a safety technique but is also important for an audience to maintain uninterrupted suspension of disbelief.

== Types ==
=== In theater ===
Having its roots in Medieval theatre, stage combat enters classical theatre choreography with Elizabethan drama (Shakespeare's simple and oft seen stage direction, they fight).

Photograph from a 1901 Swedish production of Cyrano de Bergerac at the Royal Dramatic Theatre

Classical stageplays with sword fight scenes:

- Romeo and Juliet (1597) by William Shakespeare
- Henry IV (1597) by William Shakespeare
- Hamlet (circa 1600) by William Shakespeare
- Macbeth (circa 1605) by William Shakespeare
- King Lear (1606) by William Shakespeare (Cornwall and the servant, Act III; Edgar and Edmund, Act V)
- Troilus and Cressida (1609) by William Shakespeare
- 'Tis Pity She's a Whore (circa 1630) by John Ford
- The Rover (1677) by Aphra Behn
- Die Räuber (1781) by Friedrich Schiller
- Cyrano de Bergerac (1897) by Edmond Rostand

=== In film ===
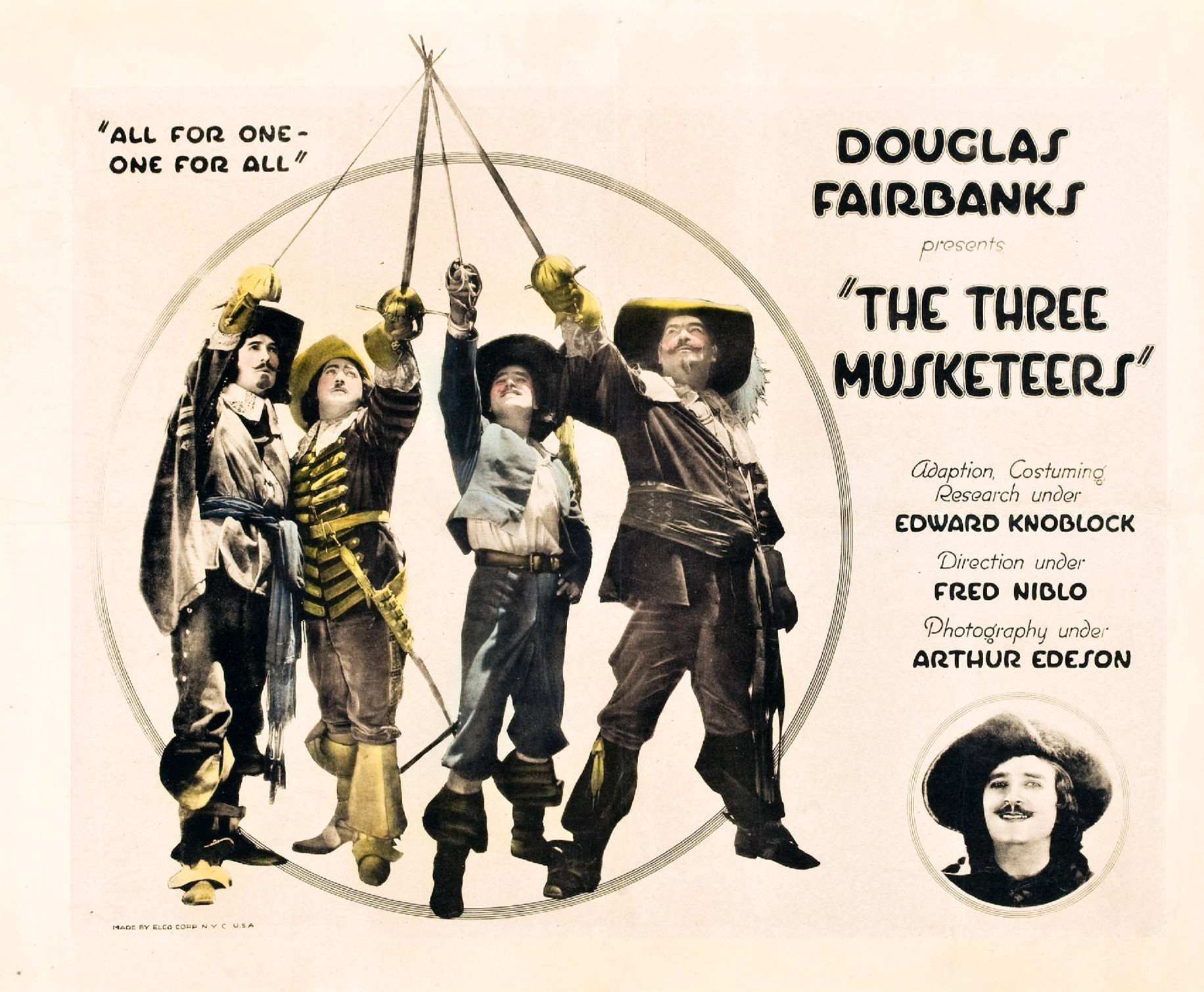
Movie poster for The Three Musketeers (1921) starring Douglas Fairbanks

Cinema inherited the concept of choreographed fights directly from the theatrical fight. Douglas Fairbanks in 1920 was the first film director to ask a fencing master to assist the production of a fencing scene in cinema. A second wave of swashbuckling films was triggered with Errol Flynn from 1935. Renewed interest in swashbuckling films arose in the 1970s, in the wake of The Three Musketeers (1973). Directors at this stage aimed for a certain amount of historical accuracy, although, as the 2007 Encyclopædia Britannica puts it, "movie fencing remains a poor representation of actual fencing technique". The Star Wars films, the fights for which are choreographed by Bob Anderson & Peter Diamond (Episodes IV, V & VI) and Nick Gillard (Episodes I, II & III), tend to portray its lightsaber combat using swordsmanship techniques drawn from existing martial arts, but performed with fantasy weapons such as lightsabers or the Force, whereas the action featured in The Lord of the Rings also choreographed by Bob Anderson employed fantasy weapons and fighting styles, designed by Tony Wolf.

During the 1970s and 1980s, Bruce Lee, Sonny Chiba, Jackie Chan and Sammo Hung became famous for both choreographing and acting in martial arts action films, and were influential in the development of stage combat on film. Hong Kong-based fight choreographer Yuen Woo-ping is known for his work on Crouching Tiger, Hidden Dragon and the Matrix trilogy, in which the often unrealistic fighting techniques are complemented by directorial techniques such as bullet time. Ching Siu-tung is particularly noted in the field of Hong Kong action cinema for his use of graceful wire fu techniques. By contrast, films such as The Duellists, fight directed by William Hobbs, Once Were Warriors, fight directed by Robert Bruce and Troy & Ironclad, fight directed by Richard Ryan are widely famed for including gritty, realistic combat scenes. Ryan is also known for his creativity in devising styles such as Batman's in The Dark Knight, Sherlock Holmes 'prevision' style in Guy Ritchie's two Sherlock Holmes movies.

=== Combat reenactment ===
Combat reenactment is a side of historical reenactment which aims to depict events of battle, normally a specific engagement in history, but also unscripted battles where the 'winner' is not predetermined.

== See also ==
- Hong Kong action cinema
- Kung Fu Theater
- Martial arts film
- Samurai cinema
