= William Hobbs (choreographer) =

British choreographer

- Born: 29 January 1939; Hampstead, London, England, United Kingdom
- Died: 10 July 2018 (aged 79); Hillingdon Hospital, Hillingdon, London
- Occupation: Fight choreographer
- Years active: 1962–2014
- Spouse: Janet Hobbs
- Children: Laurence Hobbs. Edwin Hobbs

William Hobbs (29 January 1939 – 10 July 2018) was a choreographer of stage combat.

Born in Hampstead, London, he arranged scenes of cinematic fencing from the 1960s to the 2000s as well as working in theatre productions.

== Early life and education ==
Hobbs was born in 1939 in Hampstead, London, the son of Kenneth and Joan (née Kerlindsay). His father was an RAF Lancaster bomber pilot who was killed in 1942 during a raid on Germany. Six years later, Hobbs moved to Australia with his mother and his aunt Lesley. While at school in Australia, Hobbs developed interests in fencing and the theatre. He later returned to the UK and studied for three years at the Royal Central School of Speech and Drama.

He worked on community enterprises, being the co-owner of the Swash and Buckle Fencing Club (established initially for Equity members), and was a founder of the Actors' Centre in 1978. Gene Wilder accepted the patronage of Swash and Buckle, a friendship formed during Hobbs' work on the Adventure of Sherlock Holmes' Smarter Brother.

== Filmography ==
=== Choreography ===
- H.M.S. Defiant (1962)
- Othello (1965)
- The Tragedy of Macbeth (1971)
- The Three Musketeers (1973)
- Captain Kronos – Vampire Hunter (1974)
- The Four Musketeers (1974)
- Royal Flash (1975)
- The Adventure of Sherlock Holmes' Smarter Brother (1975)
- The Legend of Robin Hood (1975)
- Robin and Marian (1976)
- Joseph Andrews (1977)
- The Duellists (1977)
- Treasure Island (1977)
- Flash Gordon (1980)
- Excalibur (1981)
- King Lear (1983)
- Brazil (1985)
- Ladyhawke (1985)
- Pirates (1986)
- Dangerous Liaisons (1988)
- Willow (1988)
- The Return of the Musketeers (1989)
- Cyrano de Bergerac (1990)
- Hamlet (1990)
- Clarissa (1991)
- Prisoner of Honor (1991)
- Robin Hood (1991)
- Rob Roy (1995)
- Dangerous Beauty (1998)
- Shakespeare in Love (1998)
- The Avengers (1998)
- The Man in the Iron Mask (1998)
- Don Quixote (2000)
- The Count of Monte Cristo (2002)
- George and the Dragon (2004)
- Casanova (2005)
- Game of Thrones (2011)

=== Actor ===
- Othello (1965) - Cypriot Officer / Senators-Soldiers-Cypriots
- The Tragedy of Macbeth (1971) - Young Seyward
- The Three Musketeers (1973) - Assassin
- Captain Kronos – Vampire Hunter (1974) - Hagen
- The Duellists (1977) - Swordsman
- Death or Freedom (1977) - Hauptmann (final film role)

== Publications ==
- 1967, Techniques of the Stage Fight, Studio Vista, ISBN 978-0-289-36985-2.
- 1980, Stage Combat: "The Action to the Word", Barrie & Jenkins, ISBN 978-0-214-20574-3.
- 1995, Fight Direction for Stage and Screen, Heinemann, ISBN 978-0-435-08680-0.
