= The Duel (short story) =

- Short story by Joseph Conrad
- Country: United Kingdom
- Language: English

Publication
- Published in: The Pall Mall Magazine
- Publication date: January–May, 1908

"The Duel" is a work of short fiction by Joseph Conrad, first published in The Pall Mall Magazine in January–May, 1908. The story was collected in A Set of Six (1908) released by Methuen Publishing. It was adapted as the 1977 film The Duellists, directed by Ridley Scott.

== Plot ==
"The Duel" is told from a third-person omniscient point of view. The story is set during the Napoleonic Wars (1803–1815), a period of mass military mobilization across Europe.

The focal characters are two French cavalry officers—Hussars—serving in Napoleon's army. Though dueling is frowned upon by the military establishment, it is not forbidden. Only officers of the same rank may engage in these contests to resolve matters of personal honor.

The story opens in Strasbourg during a brief lull in the military campaigns. Lieutenant d'Hubert is an officier d'ordonnance for the division. Tall and blond, his temperament is proud, yet mild and phlegmatic. Of Picardian heritage, he ranks among the gentry: his future in the military is promising. Lieutenant Feraud is a short, well-built Gascon with black curly hair. His temperament is fiery and impulsive. Unlike d'Hubert, he does not possess family connections. Both men are admired within their own circle of friends. Skilled at arms and possessing great physical courage, they are each dedicated to serving Napoleon.

In Strasbourg, Lieut. Feraud and a gentleman from one the town's first families quarrel in a local tavern. A duel is quickly arranged, and the gentleman is severely wounded by Feraud. The commander of the garrison orders d'Hubert to find Feraud and place him under house arrest until the matter can be resolved with the influential family.

D'Hubert finds Feraud at Madame de Lionne's elite salon. Feraud is appalled and infuriated at d'Hubert's officious intrusion. When he discovers he is being placed under house arrest, d'Hubert becomes the object of his outrage. Despite d'Hubert's efforts to calm his fellow officer, Feraud draws his sword in earnest. A desperate sword fight ensues. Feraud suffers a minor wound, but the combat solves nothing.

During the next sixteen years—during the bloody campaigns of the Napoleonic War—the two officers, each enjoying promotions to senior officers, engage in a succession of duels. These combats are always initiated by Feraud, whose desire to kill d'Hubert develops into an obsession. D'Hubert, in turn, defends himself as a simple matter of honor. The conflict between the officers becomes almost legendary. Their contemporaries attach a significance to the origins of the dispute that endows it with a gravity it does not possess. The perpetual and life-threatening conflict sustained by Feraud and d'Hubert takes on almost mythical proportions.

In the post-war era the adversaries enter their middle age. Feraud, still in pursuit, confronts d'Hubert at his country estate and demands satisfaction to be settled with dueling pistols. D'Hubert outwits his adversary, enabling him to spare Feraud's life. As a condition he extracts a promise from his nemesis that they never fight again.

== Background ==
Conrad's "fascination" with the Napoleonic Wars (1799–1815) was informed in his youth by a Polish uncle who had participated in Napoleon's Russia Campaign in 1812. Literary critic Jocelyn Baines writes:

Conrad saturated himself in the history and memoirs of the period with the prime aim of preparing the background for his Napoleonic novel, but his reading went far beyond this limited purpose. His library contained more books connected with this subject than with any other.

The scenario for "The Duel" had its origins in an 1858 account published in Harper's Magazine, which Conrad may have enlisted as the basis for his story. Another inspiration for Conrad may have been the duelling rivalry between French officers Pierre Dupont de l'Étang and François Louis Fournier-Sarlovèze, which lasted for years and which the same magazine covered in detail.

== Critical assessment ==
Literary critic Jocelyn Baines praises "The Duel" as a "delightful tale of how one of Napoleon's officers, Feraud, a fiery little Gascon, compels another, a cautious and gentle Picardian named d'Hubert, to fight a succession of duels with him because he imagines himself insulted." Baines continues: "It is an excellently told tale, gently humorous and ironical, but touches no very deep emotion, and Conrad was claiming rather a lot to describe it as an attempt to 'capture...the Spirit of the Epoch.'"

Literary critic Laurence Graver includes "The Duel" among Conrad's "most optimistic and least demanding works..." Indeed, Conrad, in a letter to his agent J. B. Pinker, wrote: "...my modesty prevents me from saying that I think the story is good. Action sensational. The happy ending."

== Theme ==
Critic Graver identifies the theme as a conflict between "egoism and altruism" reflected in the characters of Feraud and d'Hubert, respectively. The focal character of the tale, officer d'Hubert, develops an ambivalence for officer Feraud, combining an "irreconcilable antagonism" with an "irrational affection." Graver writes:

Instead of analyzing the obsessive psychology of the two officers, Conrad keeps pointing to the absurd fatality of their predicament [and] the spectacular passions of the age...he settles on familiar generalizations about military gossip and the racial distinctions between [France's regional] north and south...the characters are soon reduced to ludicrous figures in Opera bouffe.

The essentially petty feud between the two officers is offered as a tableau for the monumental upheavals of early nineteenth-century Europe.

Critic Baines notes the parallel that Conrad attempts to draw between a minor personal dispute concerning honor and self-esteem and the European social catastrophe of the early 19th century:

The quarrel lasts for sixteen years during Napoleon's domination of Europe and after...No one except the antagonists knows its trivial cause, and when d'Hubert finally reveals it, one of the characters comments..."no one will ever know the secret of this affair".

== Adaptations ==
Film

- The Duellists is a 1977 British historical drama film directed by Ridley Scott and produced by David Puttnam based on Joseph Conrad's short story "The Duel".

== Sources ==
- Baines, Jocelyn. 1960. Joseph Conrad: A Critical Biography, McGraw-Hill Book Company, New York. ISBN 978-0297167556
- Graver, Laurence. 1969. Conrad's Short Fiction. University of California Press, Berkeley, California. ISBN 0-520-00513-9
