= Wolf System stage combat training =

The Wolf System was founded in 1988 by the fight choreographer and stage combat/martial arts instructor, Tony Wolf. It has been applied to a range of production genres including professional theatre, opera, ballet, film, television and motion capture, notably including The Lord of the Rings film trilogy, as well as to physical theater, martial arts and self defense training.

== History ==
The Wolf System (under the name "Re:Action") was originally a collection of techniques adapted from professional wrestling, historical fencing, mime and various martial arts styles. Over time, and due in part to the pedagogical influence of the modern dance discipline of contact improvisation and of the Russian martial art of Ryabko Systema, the Wolf System's emphasis shifted from a curriculum of specific techniques to an open-ended progression of largely improvised training games and exercises.

The system was introduced to the international community at the Paddy Crean International Stage Combat Conferences held at the Banff Centre in Alberta, Canada, in 1998. Since then, aspects of the system have been taught to actors, directors, martial artists, dancers, choreographers and stunt performers in New Zealand, Australia, Canada and the US, as well as at master-class seminars in England, Ireland, Norway, the Netherlands, Italy and Germany.

== Philosophy and pedagogy ==
The Wolf System is designed to teach a series of fundamental movement and/or performance skills, which are divided into the following categories:

Synergy - non-verbal, especially tactile responsiveness and communication
Articulation - cycles of preparation, action and reaction in performing stage combat techniques, both for the safety of the performers and for clarity of live or on-camera performance
Illusion - methods of misdirection and of concealing certain safety measures from the audience or camera to preserve the illusion of actual combat
Alignment - methods of skeletal alignment supported by muscular control as used in maintaining balance and in supporting another person's body weight
Extension - methods of projecting momentum
Cascade - methods of safely moving from a standing position to the floor by collapsing or rolling
Measure - methods of judging the active distance between oneself and another person

Of the above, both Articulation and Illusion are specific to the use of the Wolf System in stage combat training. The two fundamental premises of the Wolf System in stage combat are defined as Safety and Storytelling, both with reference to performance combat as a skill of theatrical illusion.

== Wolf System exercises ==
Some of the games and exercises may be performed individually while others may be performed in pairs or by groups of up to 20 people.

Participants in this form of training constantly alternate between co-operating and competing with their partner(s) during different exercises. Co-operative games require the participants to work together to achieve a specific result, such as balancing against each other's bodies while in physically awkward positions or keeping their hands in contact while performing various improvised movement exercises. Competitive games require the participants to work against each other, as in contests of balance and speed.

Participants also alternate between moving "in character" and as themselves, between improvised and choreographed exercises and between assuming active and passive roles during the various exercises.

To perform Wolf System exercises with a partner or in a group environment is known as jamming, a term borrowed from contact improvisation and from jazz.

The Wolf System can be used to introduce combative concepts and skills to students who may not have any previous background in fencing, martial arts or related disciplines. Also, the open-ended nature of the exercises allow participants to experiment with a wide range of unusual fighting techniques and styles, including many that are not typically offered in more orthodox stage combat or martial arts training programs.

== Sources ==
- Wolf, Tony: "Action Design: New Directions in Fight Choreography", Martial Arts in the Modern World, Praeger Publications, 2003
- Wolf, Tony: "Kampf ist Emotion", Cast magazine, issue 6, Germany, December-January 2005
- Wolf System website
