= A Set of Six =

Short fiction books by Joseph Conrad

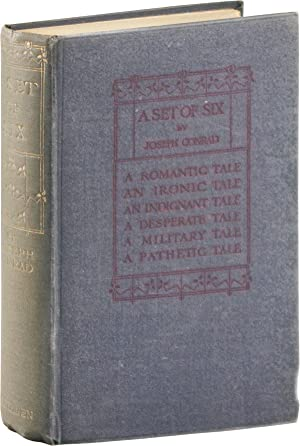
- First edition cover
- Author: Joseph Conrad
- Language: English
- Genre: Short Stories
- Publisher: Methuen and Company
- Publication date: 1908
- Publication place: United Kingdom
- Media type: Print (hardcover)
- Pages: 310
- OCLC: 557218

A Set of Six is a collection of six works of short fiction by Joseph Conrad, each appearing in literary journals between 1906 and 1908. The works were collected in A Set of Six, published in 1908 by Methuen and Company .

== Stories ==
The works in the collection first appeared in literary journals:

“Gaspar Ruiz” (Pall Mall Magazine, July–October 1906)
“The Brute” (Daily Chronicle, December 5, 1906)
“An Anarchist” (Harper’s Magazine, August 1906)
“The Informer” (Harper’s Magazine, December 1906)
“Il Conde” (Cassell's Magazine, August 1908)
“The Duel” (The Pall Mall Magazine, January–May 1908)

== Background ==
Conrad, at the age of 44, embarked on his first major literary project, Nostromo, completed and published in 1904. In composing Nostromo, Conrad sought to present a broader social landscape in his work. The subject of his early writing, involving "moral dramas tested by the unfamiliar menace of a primitive world" were in abeyance during this period. Between October 1902 and November 1905, Conrad wrote no short fiction.

When he returned to writing short stories, Conrad regarded these as "instruments for raising money quickly" rather than serious literary endeavors. In a letter to Sir Algernon Methuen in January 1908, Conrad explained his approach to writing the material in A Set of Six:

All the stories are stories of incident – action – not of analysis. All are dramatic in a measure but by no means of a gloomy sort... they are not studies – they touch no problem. They are just stories in which I've tried my best to be simply entertaining.

The stories in A Set of Six contrast with his earlier short fiction in that they are neither autobiographical nor based on first-hand experience. Literary critic Laurence Graver notes that a central theme in his earliest stories, namely, the conflict between "egoism and altruism" is largely absent in this collection: "a new emphasis is placed on love and humor, two elements Conrad seemed to think were indispensable in popular fiction."

== Sources ==
- Baines, Jocelyn. 1960. Joseph Conrad: A Critical Biography, McGraw-Hill Book Company, New York. ISBN 978-0297167556
- Graver, Laurence. 1969. Conrad’s Short Fiction. University of California Press, Berkeley, California. ISBN 0-520-00513-9
- Guerard, Albert J. 1965. Conrad: The Novelist. Harvard University Press, Cambridge, Massachusetts. LOC Catalog Card Number 58-8995.ISBN 978-0674163508
