= Tiltyard =

Enclosed courtyard for jousting or knight's games

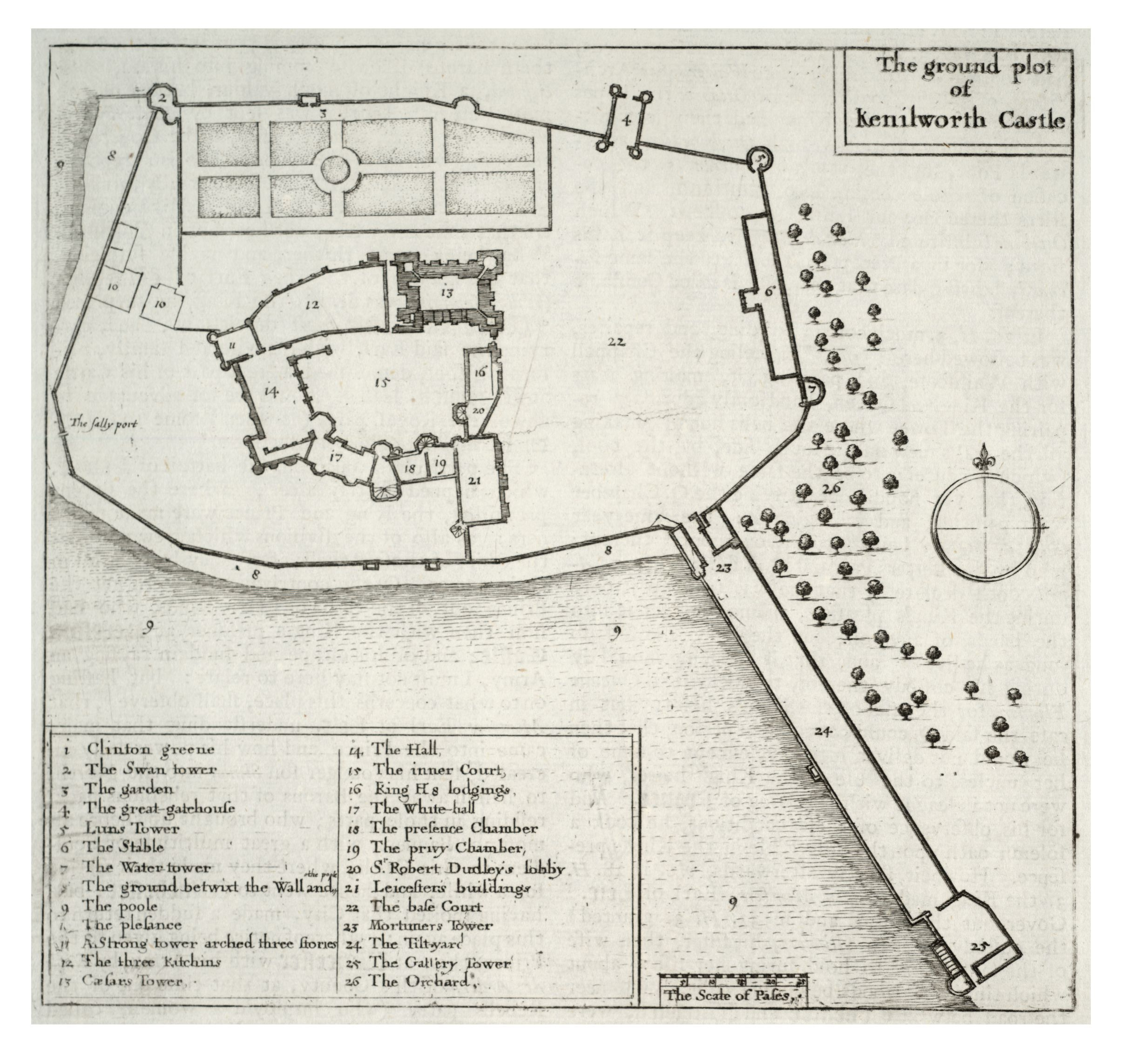
A plan of Kenilworth Castle shortly before the English Civil War by Wenceslas Hollar. The tiltyard is the large rectangle on the south east corner of the plan.

A tiltyard (or tilt yard or tilt-yard) was an enclosed courtyard for jousting. Tiltyards were a common feature of Tudor era castles and palaces. The Horse Guards Parade in London was formerly the tiltyard constructed by Henry VIII as an entertainment venue adjacent to Whitehall Palace; it was the site of the Accession Day tilts in the reigns of Elizabeth I and James I.

Henry VIII also constructed a tiltyard at Hampton Court Palace, where one of the towers, known as the Tiltyard Tower, was used for viewing the tournaments below.

The Tiltyard at Whitehall was "a permanent structure and apparently had room for 10–12,000 spectators, accommodated in conditions which ranged from the spartan to the opulent." Ambitious young aristocrats participated in the Accession Day events for the Elizabeth I in 1595 where "the whole chivalric nature of the tournament with its mock combat and heroic connotations was peculiarly appealing." The aristocrats who attended wore elaborate costumes "designed and made for themselves and their servants."

Another tiltyard used during the reign of Queen Elizabeth existed at Kenilworth Castle in Warwickshire. It was constructed on top of one of the dams that formed part of the water defences between the outer bailey and the bridgehead. Today, it forms the main walkway to the castle.

A modern tiltyard was constructed at the Royal Armouries Museum (opened 1996) in Leeds for demonstrations of medieval martial pursuits, including jousting reenactment and falconry. Since Easter 2000, it has hosted an annual competitive jousting team tournament devised by John Waller, then the Museum's Head of Interpretation, for a trophy called the Sword of Honour.
