= John Waller (fight director) =

English fight director (1940–2018)

- With the Medieval Society, 1981; Photograph by Dominic Cooper
- Born: 12 August 1940; Welling, Bexley, London
- Died: 20 April 2018 (aged 77)
- Known for: HEMA revival Fight director

John Waller (12 August 1940 – 20 April 2018) was an English pioneer of the historical European martial arts (HEMA) revival, a fight director for stage, screen and spectacle, and a teacher of martial arts.

== Biography ==
He was born in Welling, at that time in the London Borough of Bexley. His father, John William Waller, was a veterinary surgeon in the 1st Battalion, the Middlesex Regiment, and was captured by the Japanese at the Fall of Hong Kong in December 1941. Father and son did not meet until after the father's liberation by the Soviet Red Army at the end of World War II. Waller's childhood was disrupted by his parents' divorce and many house moves; he attended nine schools. He left full-time education at 16, and had various jobs.

He had always been interested in history, and was inspired as a teenager by three Hollywood historical films: Ivanhoe (1952), Knights of the Round Table (1953) and Quentin Durward (1955), all directed by Richard Thorpe and starring Robert Taylor, which form an unofficial trilogy. He became interested in the Middle Ages; not as book history, but as to how people lived and thought, especially the concept of knightly honour. He began to make replicas of historical weapons and armour, and set out on a lifelong quest to understand how they were used and how effective they were. At the age of 16, he took up archery (preferring field archery over target shooting). In 1960, he met Rosemary Atkinson at Bromley Archery Club, in London. They shared the same interests, and married two years later. Their only son, Jonathan, was born in 1970.

In 1963, he was recruited to run the archery department of the specialist sporting goods store Lillywhites in Regent Street, London. The same year, he was a founding member of the Medieval Society, the first of the now-many period-specific historical reenactment societies; specifically, for medieval reenactment. They had several obstacles to overcome: from the disdain of professional historians for the idea of amateur reenactment, through the difficulty of acquiring authentic clothing, armour and weapons when the only suppliers were theatrical costumiers, (Note: According to HEMA practitioner and military historian Tobias Capwell, who knew Waller, the Society's first helms were made out of car headlamp reflectors retrieved from scrapyards.) to working out how to perform dangerous long-forgotten combat skills with low risk of serious injury. So, they made and learned everything themselves, using the historical records; especially, the items on display in the Wallace Collection in London.

In 1965, actor Robert Hardy (who had a deep interest in archery) visited Lillywhites, and Waller sold him a longbow and arrows. Through that and other contacts made while working there, Waller discovered an opportunity suited to his interests and skills - fight arranger, action coordinator and historical adviser for stage and screen. His first engagement was in 1965 for a production of the pantomime Babes in the Wood at the London Palladium. During his career, he worked on over 60 plays and 15 operas in London and the English regions, about 50 television dramas, soap operas and documentaries, and many television commercials (including a 28-year association with Strongbow cider and its "thudding arrows" motif). He worked on more than 10 feature films; including Anne of a Thousand Days (1969), Mary, Queen of Scots (1971), Monty Python and the Holy Grail (1975), (Note: In 1995, historian Guy Wilson, Master of the Armouries, and Waller visited the United States. At a HEMA gathering in Philadelphia, Wilson was greeted with polite applause; and Waller with wild cheers, low bows, and shouts of "We are not worthy" (a near-quote from Monty Python and the Holy Grail).) and Legend (1985). He taught actors at, among other institutions, the London Academy of Music and Dramatic Art and the Guildhall School of Music and Drama. His guiding principle was, "reality first, theatricality second". He strove for historical accuracy; before him, staged sword fighting had been largely based around modern sport fencing techniques. In fantasy settings his question was, "If it could have happened, how would it have happened?"

In 1967, he left Lillywhites to set up his own shop, Bows and Blades, on Tower Hill, facing the main entrance to the Tower of London; it prospered. In 1969, he was a founding member of the Society of British Fight Directors (which later changed its name to the British Academy of Dramatic Combat, and which was later still absorbed into the British Academy of Stage and Screen Combat). He pioneered safer practices in medieval and renaissance combat reenactment. He collaborated with Brigadier Peter Young, founder of The Sealed Knot, a society which specialises in English Civil War reenactment. The modern acceptance of reenactment and living history, based on careful research and experiment, as valid and useful owes much to Waller's and Young's hard work, enthusiasm and skill. The Medieval Society flourished, and in its day gave many displays of martial skills, including archery, foot combat and jousting, at historic venues in the United Kingdom and France. In 1973, Waller invented the balsawood lance, which has the advantages for show combat that it breaks easily (often spectacularly) on impact, and poses less risk to even an armoured human target than one of stouter wood. It was used in a 1974 commercial directed by a young Ridley Scott for the (short-lived) Amazin' Raisin chocolate bar, and has remained popular with reenactors ever since.

Waller assisted Hardy during the writing of his authoritative 1976 book Longbow: A Social and Military History (which was used as basis for a BBC TV documentary). This included taking part in the first scientific ballistic trials (at the Royal Armaments Research and Development Establishment) of the English longbow. In 1977, the Royal Armouries (then based only in the Tower of London) had the idea of making a short film, How a Man Schall be Armyd, which would show a knight being equipped with plate armour, mounting a horse and riding off. The armour would be from their own collection, made in the Royal Workshops at Greenwich during the reign of Queen Elizabeth I (r. 1558–1603). They needed someone who could wear armour and ride in it, look natural while doing so, and be trusted with a historical relic. They knew exactly the man to ask, and Waller accepted their invitation; so beginning a long association. The film was shot at Bodiam Castle in Kent, and as of 2018 the Armouries were still showing it.

The Tower could only display a small fraction of the Armouries' collection. They had an idea of moving the bulk of the arms and armour collection to a purpose-built facility. That came to fruition in 1996, when, under the direction of Guy Wilson (Master of the Armouries 1988–2002), the Royal Armouries Museum was opened in Leeds. Wilson and Waller had been good friends since before the planning stage, and the new museum incorporated many of Waller's ideas for demonstration areas, where visitors could see craftsmen at work or watch displays of martial prowess. In 1994, after the project has been given the go-ahead, Waller was appointed Head of Interpretation at the Royal Armouries. He recruited and trained the actor demonstrators, and worked with the curators to research and develop scripts and fight sequences. He worked with the Armouries on several short films and also TV documentaries under the general title Arms in Action. In 2000, he founded the European Historical Combat Guild, which studies and practices HEMA. Also in 2000, he organised the first of what became an annual event - a competitive (not demonstration) jousting team tournament held over the Easter weekend in the Museum Tiltyard, for a trophy called the Sword of Honour. He retired in 2007, but maintained a connection as a part-time consultant. He acted as adviser to major archaeological investigations, including the Towton battlefield (1461) in Yorkshire and the Mary Rose, King Henry VIII's flagship, which had sunk in the Solent off the south coast of England in 1545.

He was a skilled archer, fighter both unarmed and with one- and two-handed weapons, and horseman. He was an excellent teacher, and also had the patience to train falcons. He was a craftsman in wood, leather and metal. He never learnt to drive; he was not interested. He had a store of unusual knowledge, which he shared freely. He had a fertile and inquiring mind and strong opinions, and expected the highest of standards from both actors and academics. He had a deep love of music, his tastes ranging from English music hall singer Al Bowlly to classical composers of the English Pastoral School, particularly Vaughan Williams.

He died in 2018 after a brief illness. He was survived by his wife and his son; who since 1993 has taught stage combat (including, like his father, at the Guildhall School of Music and Drama and the London Academy of Music and Dramatic Art), has been a combat advisor for stage and screen, and has worked with the Royal Armouries and the Mary Rose Trust.

== Publications ==
- Ducklin, Keith; Waller, John (30 November 2000). Sword Fighting: A Manual for Actors & Directors. Applause Press. ISBN 978-1557834591.
- Waller, Jonathan; Waller, John (2010). "The Personal Carriage of Arrows from Hastings to the Mary Rose". Arms & Armour. 7 (2). Royal Armouries: 155–177. doi:10.1179/174161210X12810012151357. S2CID 162208042.
- Hildred, Alexzandra, ed. (2011). Weapons of Warre: The Armaments of the Mary Rose. Waller, John - contributor. Mary Rose Trust. ISBN 978-0954402938.
