= Paddy Crean =

British actor and theatrical fight director

- Born: Patrick Crean; 27 June 1910; Mayfair, London
- Died: 22 December 2003 (aged 93); Toronto, Ontario, Canada
- Citizenship: Canada
- Occupations: Fencing Master, Actor, Fight Director
- Organization: British Academy of Dramatic Combat Fight Directors Canada Society of American Fight Directors
- Known for: Sophy School of Fencing Stage-Combat Safety Protocols Denisov in War and Peace
- Notable work: More Champagne Darling (1981)
- Spouses: Joan Panter (divorced) Helen Christie (m. 1943, divorced) Anna Korda (m. 1948, divorced 1963) Susan Murar (m. 1978)
- Parents: Thomas Crean (father); Victoria de Heredia (mother)

Patrick Crean (27 June 1910 – 22 December 2003) was a British actor and theatrical fight director who was one of the most influential figures in the art of modern stage combat.

Crean was born in London to parents Surgeon-Major Thomas Crean VC and Victoria Heredia, who was born in Spain. Crean, who had a background in competitive fencing, began choreographing fights in 1932 when he was working in England as an actor in The Legends of Don Juan. He received public acclaim for choreographing the impressive fight scenes for John Guilgud's 1944–45 season of Hamlet at the Haymarket, with a personal feature on Pathé News and in Post Magazine. Crean and his partner Rex Rickman were frequently hired to stage fight scenes for theatrical productions as well as in films such as The Master of Ballantrae (1953) and Sword of Sherwood Forest (1960). They both ran the Sophy School of Fencing in London and used it to teach many celebrities sword work for stage and films. He worked with actors including Paul Scofield, Laurence Olivier, Trevor Howard, Alec Guinness, Douglas Fairbanks Jr. and Errol Flynn, often performing as Flynn's stunt double in films.

Crean travelled to the Canadian Stratford Theatre Festival in 1962 to serve as the fight arranger for Macbeth, directed by Peter Coe. After his second season in 1963, he decided to make Stratford, Ontario his home and worked as the festival's fight director until 1983. Among festival productions for which he arranged the swordplay, The Three Musketeers, directed by John Hirsch in 1968, received great acclaim for its stage action. Crean returned from retirement in 1988 to assist fight director Jean-Pierre Fournier for The Three Musketeers as directed by Richard Ouzounian.

Crean's choreographic philosophy included tenets such as matching the combat to the character and included research into various historical and cultural forms of swordplay. His system of stage combat safety protocols were highly influential around the world. Those guidelines were codified through the Society of British Fight Directors, for which Crean was a fight master. He was also a certified fight master with Fight Directors Canada as well as being an honorary member of the Society of American Fight Directors.

Crean continued to work as an actor, sometimes taking small roles in shows for which he had done fight arranging and also performing his one-man show about Rudyard Kipling, The Sun Never Sets, at Stratford's Avon Theatre in 1970.

His autobiography, More Champagne, Darling (ISBN 0075480778), was published in Toronto by McGraw-Hill Ryerson in 1981.

The annual Paddy Crean International Stage Combat Conferences, named in honour of Mr. Crean, present a wide range of seminars run by prominent stage combat and martial arts instructors.

Patrick Crean died on 22 December 2003, at the age of 92. He was once married to the actress Helen Christie.

== Filmography ==
Year	Title	Role	Notes
1953	The Story of William Tell	Peasant	Unfinished film
1956	War and Peace	Denisov	
1957	Seven Hills of Rome	Mr. Fante	Uncredited
1957	A Farewell to Arms	Medical Lieutenant	Uncredited
1958	Tread Softly Stranger	Blue Blazer	
1958	The Naked Maja	Enrique	
1959	The Cat Gang	Tug Wilson	
1960	Sword of Sherwood Forest	Lord Ollerton	Uncredited
1980	Head On	Fencing Master	
