= Frank Tidy =

English cinematographer

- Born: 17 May 1932; Liverpool, Merseyside, England, UK
- Died: 27 January 2017 (aged 84); Kent, England, UK
- Years active: 1975–2004

Frank Tidy (17 May 1932 – 27 January 2017) was an English cinematographer.

== Life and career ==
Born in Liverpool, Tidy initially worked in stop motion animation before beginning working as a cinematographer. Along with Roger Woodburn and Peter Biziou, he founded the company Valley Films, and would work on hundreds of commercials, many of which directed by eventual film director Ridley Scott and his brother Tony Scott.

In 1977, he would serve as cinematographer on Ridley Scott's directorial debut The Duellists, for which he received a nomination for the BAFTA Award for Best Cinematography.

Tidy died on 27 January 2017, aged 84, at a Kent nursing home after suffering from dementia.

== Filmography ==
=== Film ===
Year	Title	Director	Notes
1975	Parker Pens: Finishing School	Alan Parker	Direct-to-video
1977	The Duellists	Ridley Scott	
1979	Dracula	John Badham	Uncredited
1980	The Lucky Star	Max Fischer	
1982	The Grey Fox	Phillip Borsos	
1983	Spacehunter: Adventures in the Forbidden Zone	Lamont Johnson	
1985	The Mean Season	Phillip Borsos	
1985	Code of Silence	Andrew Davis	
1985	One Magic Christmas	Phillip Borsos	
1986	Sweet Liberty	Alan Alda	
1986	John and the Missus	Gordon Pinsent	
1987	Hot Pursuit	Steven Lisberger	Also made a cameo as "Britisher"
1988	The Raggedy Rawney	Bob Hoskins	
1989	Slipstream	Steven Lisberger	
1989	The Package	Andrew Davis	
1991	The Butcher's Wife	Terry Hughes	Also made a cameo
1992	Stop! Or My Mom Will Shoot	Roger Spottiswoode	
1992	Under Siege	Andrew Davis	
1994	Wagons East	Peter Markle	
1995	Steal Big Steal Little	Andrew Davis	
1996	Getting Away with Murder	Harvey Miller	
1996	Chain Reaction	Andrew Davis	
1997	Hoodlum	Bill Duke	
2004	Some Things That Stay	Gail Harvey	

=== Television ===
Year	Title	Director	Notes
1981−82	The Phoenix	Douglas Hickox; Reza Badiyi	
1995	Black Fox	Steven Hilliard Stern	Miniseries

TV movies

Year	Title	Director
1988	April Morning	Delbert Mann
1989	Sorry, Wrong Number	Tony Wharmby
1989	Final Notice	Steven Hilliard Stern
1990	Personals	Steven Hilliard Stern
1990	The Kissing Place	Tony Wharmby
1990	Hitler's Daughter	James A. Contner
1990	The Last Best Year	John Erman
1992	Through the Eyes of a Killer	Peter Markle
1993	Shattered Trust: The Shari Karney Story	Bill Corcoran
1994	One More Mountain	Dick Lowry
1994	She Led Two Lives	Bill Corcoran
1996	The Boys Next Door	John Erman
1996	A Holiday for Love	Jerry London
1997	The Third Twin	Tom McLoughlin
1998	My Father's Shadow: The Sam Sheppard Story	Peter Levin
1998	Dead Husbands	Paul Shapiro
2000	The Christmas Secret	Ian Barry
2001	Jewel	Paul Shapiro

== Accolades ==
Year	Award	Category	Title	Result
1977	BAFTA Awards	Best Cinematography	The Duellists	Nominated
1977	British Society of Cinematographers	Best Cinematography	The Duellists	Nominated
1985	Genie Awards	Best Cinematography	One Magic Christmas	Nominated
