= British Academy of Stage and Screen Combat =

The British Academy of Stage & Screen Combat
- The British Academy Of Stage & Screen Combat (BASSC) logo
- Abbreviation: BASSC
- Predecessor: Society of British Fight Directors
- Formation: 1993
- Type: Academy
- Purpose: Organisation for the tuition and development of stage combat for theatre, television and feature film
- Location: London, United Kingdom
- President: Ronin Traynor
- Vice President: Rosa Nicolas
- Secretary: Stephen Louis
- Treasurer: Jonathan Brown
- Key people: Master Teachers: Richard Ryan; Bret Yount; Jonathan Leverett; Philip d’Orléans; Roger Bartlett; John McFarland; Ronin Traynor; Zhenya Leverett; Certified Teachers: Aaron Anderson; Marlon Bulger; Tiza Garland; Mark D. Guinn; Kiefer Bryson; Scot Mann; Sam Colby; Rosa Nicolàs; Jonathan Brown; Jason Theodoulou; Kristo Salminen; Enric Ortuno; Yarit Dor; Andrei Zayats; Taylor Hohman; Elizabeth Talbot; Stephen Louis; Robert Myles; Nathaniel Marten; Gordon Kemp; Mariia Katkova
- Website: bassc.org

The British Academy Of Stage & Screen Combat (BASSC) is a British organisation for the tuition and development of safety in stage combat for theatre, television and feature film.

== History ==
The British Academy Of Stage & Screen Combat (BASSC) has its roots in the now defunct Society of British Fight Directors. In the early to mid nineties, the Society of British Fight Directors went through a transitional period, as its focus began to shift towards the teaching of Stage Combat. In 1996, the Society of British Fight Directors voted to change its name to the British Academy of Dramatic Combat (BADC).

The British Academy of Stage & Screen Combat was formed in 1993; many founding members being of the former S.B.F.D. The organisation set about creating its current reputation as the invigorating and driving force behind stage combat in the United Kingdom.

In 1997, British Equity recognised the BASSC’s Advanced Certificate as a valid qualification for entry onto the Equity Fight Directors’ Training Scheme, and so in 2001, the BASSC was appointed by the Equity Council for the training and assessment of Fight Directors candidates applying to join the Equity Fight Directors’ Register. The BASSC is currently respected, both nationally and internationally, as a provider of professional level stage combat training.

Richard Ryan was appointed the first Master Teacher of the BASSC. Since then, he has gone on to become an established Hollywood Fight Director. His film credits include: Sherlock Holmes, Troy, The Dark Knight, Stardust, Ironclad, The Eagle, The Last Legion, Fallen & The Hammer of The Gods. As well as television & theatre, his work extends as far as video games; Notably, he was the Fight/Combat consultant for the best-selling Xbox 360 game Fable 2 from Lionhead Studios.

== Today ==
BASSC teachers can be found at many leading UK Drama & Arts Schools, including the Royal Academy of Dramatic Art, Royal Birmingham Conservatoire of Music and Acting, East 15 Acting School, London College of Music, Royal Academy of Music, Central School of Speech and Drama, Italia Conti, Guildhall School of Music & Drama, Drama Studio, Fourth Monkey Theatre Company, British American Drama Academy, Young Actors Theatre Islington and the City Lit. Classes and workshops are also held across the UK and are open to the public and other actor/combatants.

BASSC now has training schemes in place which allow for development from Actor/Combatant to Certified Teacher, as well as assessment and training of Fight Directors for the Equity register.

== Fight Performance Exams ==
For Actor/Combatants, the BASSC offers 'Fight Performance Exams' in core stage combat weapon systems from the BASSC syllabus.

The exam requires actors to perform a dramatic scene containing a stage combat fight, choreographed and taught by a BASSC Certified Teacher. Students are marked on both stage combat technique and the acting within the scene. Based upon marks the awards available are: Fail, Pass & Pass with Distinction.

Below is a list of the BASSC core weapon syllabus:

Weapons Systems:

- Unarmed Combat
- Swashbuckling Rapier
- Rapier & Dagger
- Broadsword
- Quarterstaff
- Sword & Shield
- Smallsword
- Knife
- Rapier & Cloak
