= The Duellists =

1977 historical drama film by Ridley Scott

- American theatrical release poster
- Directed by: Ridley Scott
- Screenplay by: Gerald Vaughan-Hughes
- Based on: "The Duel" by Joseph Conrad
- Produced by: David Puttnam
- Starring: Harvey Keitel; Keith Carradine; Albert Finney; Edward Fox; Cristina Raines; Robert Stephens; Tom Conti; Stacy Keach
- Cinematography: Frank Tidy
- Edited by: Michael Bradsell (sup.); Pamela Power
- Music by: Howard Blake
- Production companies: Enigma Productions; Scott Free Enterprises; National Film Finance Consortium
- Distributed by: Paramount Pictures
- Release dates: 22 May 1977 (Cannes); 2 February 1978 (United Kingdom)
- Running time: 100 minutes
- Countries: United Kingdom; United States
- Language: English
- Budget: $900,000

The Duellists is a 1977 British historical drama film which is the directorial debut of Ridley Scott. Set in France during the Napoleonic Wars, the film focuses on a series of duels between two rival officers, the obsessive Bonapartist Gabriel Feraud (played by Harvey Keitel) and royalist Armand d'Hubert (Keith Carradine), that spans nearly 20 years and reflects the political tumult of early 19th-century France. The film is based on Joseph Conrad's 1908 short story "The Duel".

The Duellists unanimously won the award for Best Debut Film at the 1977 Cannes Film Festival, and was nominated for the Palme d'Or. The Duellists earned widespread acclaim from critics, who praised Scott's direction and visuals, and the film's historical authenticity. The fight choreography, by master swordsman William Hobbs, is considered one of the most accurate depictions of dueling in cinema. At the 32nd British Academy Film Awards, the film received nominations for Best Cinematography and Best Costume Design.

== Plot ==
=== Strasbourg 1800 ===
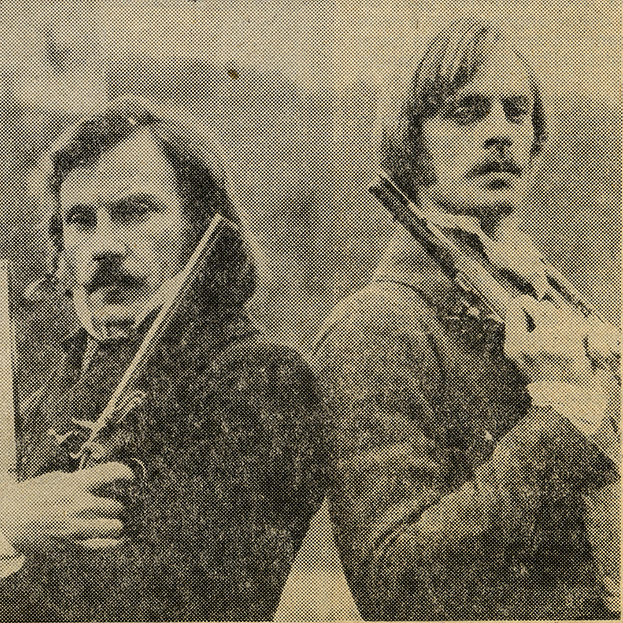
The last duel takes place in a ruin, with each combatant armed with two pistols.

In Strasbourg in 1800, Lieutenant Gabriel Feraud of the French 7th Hussars, a fervent Bonapartist and obsessive duellist, nearly kills the nephew of the city's mayor in a duel. Under pressure from the mayor, Brigadier-General Treillard orders one of his officers, Lieutenant Armand d'Hubert of the 3rd Hussars, to place Feraud under house arrest. When D'Hubert delivers the order, Feraud takes it as a personal insult and challenges him to a duel. D'Hubert does all he can to avoid Feraud's unreasonable demand for a duel but is finally left with no honorable way to avoid it. The result is inconclusive, as Feraud gets knocked unconscious before the fight ends. Then d'Hubert is attacked by Feraud's mistress, leaving his face scratched. As a result of the fight, the General dismisses d'Hubert from his staff and returns him to active duty with his regiment.

=== Augsburg 1801 ===
The war interrupts the quarrel and the two do not meet again until six months later. Feraud challenges d'Hubert to another duel and seriously wounds him. While recovering, d'Hubert's lover, Laura, takes care of him and encourages him to end the pointless duels. Instead he takes fencing lessons from a master swordsman, and in the next duel the men fight to a bloody standstill, too tired to hold their swords. They fall to the ground in a wrestle but this is broken apart by the onlookers. Soon afterwards, d'Hubert is relieved to learn he has been promoted to captain, as military discipline forbids officers of different ranks from duelling.

=== Lübeck 1806 ===
By 1806, d'Hubert's unit has been stationed in Lübeck. He is shocked to hear that the 7th Hussars have arrived in the city and that Feraud is now also a captain. Aware that in two weeks time he is to be promoted to major, d'Hubert attempts to slip away but fails to do it in time. Feraud challenges him to another duel. Before it, d'Hubert happens upon his former lover Laura. She chastises him for continuing to duel Feraud, saying that he will eventually be killed, before bidding him a tearful farewell. In the encounter, which takes place on horseback, d'Hubert slashes Feraud's forehead; with blood flowing into his eyes, Feraud is not capable of continuing the duel. Considering himself the victor, d'Hubert leaves the field ebullient, jumping his horse over a cart. Soon afterwards, Feraud's regiment is posted to Spain while d'Hubert remains stationed in Northern Europe.

=== Russia 1812 ===
The pair (both now colonels) chance upon each other during the French Army's retreat from Moscow, but are forced to cooperate after being separated from the main force. Feraud asks for volunteers to go after Russian Cossacks and d'Hubert is the only one who will go with him. On foot they are surprised by one of the enemy on horseback, with three others in the distance. Feraud shoots the one closest to them and d'Hubert drives off the others by firing at them. Then d'Hubert jokes "Pistols next time", referring to their next duel and offers Feraud a celebratory drink from his flask, but Feraud silently turns and walks away.

=== Tours 1814 ===
After Napoleon's exile to Elba, d'Hubert is now a brigadier-general recovering from a wartime injury at the home of his sister Leonie in Tours. She introduces him to Adele, the niece of her neighbour, and the couple fall in love. Colonel Perteley, a Bonapartist agent, attempts to recruit d'Hubert as rumours of Napoleon's imminent return from exile abound, but d'Hubert refuses. When Feraud, now a Bonapartist brigadier-general, learns this, he declares he always knew d'Hubert was a traitor.

=== Paris 1816 ===
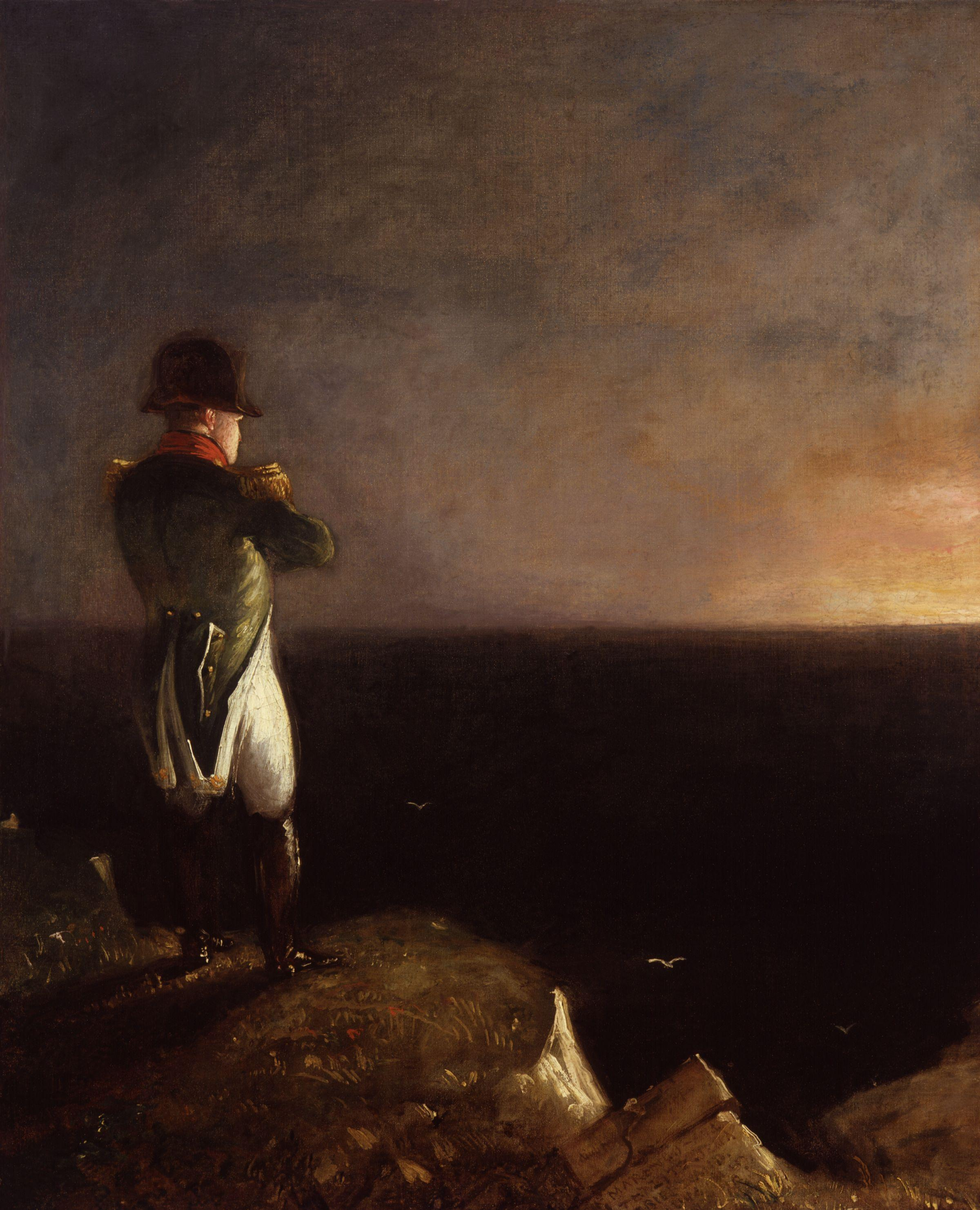
Painting of Napoleon in exile on Saint Helena

After Napoleon is defeated at Waterloo, d'Hubert marries Adele and joins the army of Louis XVIII. Feraud is arrested and is expected to be executed for his part in the Hundred Days war. Learning of this, d'Hubert calls upon the Minister of Police and persuades him to spare Feraud. Not knowing d'Hubert saved him, Feraud is paroled to live under police supervision. Meanwhile, d'Hubert and Adele prepare for the birth of their first child.

=== Final Duel 1816 ===
After learning of d'Hubert's promotion in the new French Army, an incensed Feraud sends two of his former officers to d'Hubert's estate with a challenge for a pistol duel. Reluctantly, d'Hubert agrees. The next day the two men meet in a field near the ruins of a castle. Each man is armed with two single-shot pistols to be fired at will.

After some solitary wandering, the men unknowingly end up within 50 feet of each other. Feraud sees d'Hubert and fires his first shot, missing. D'Hubert plays dead for a moment, coaxing Feraud to fire his second shot, which also misses. D'Hubert's own first shot misses Feraud, but he now has his opponent at point blank range with the only remaining loaded pistol. D'Hubert calmly stands and takes aim while Feraud screams "Go on. Kill me!".

After d'Hubert calmly walks home, he is heard in voiceover telling Feraud that, by all rights and honor, he now owns Feraud's life. D'Hubert tells Feraud that as such, he will simply declare Feraud dead, and that in all future matters concerning the two of them, Feraud shall conduct himself as a dead man and never challenge d'Hubert to another duel or bother his family. D'Hubert returns to his home and pregnant wife to live out the rest of his days in peace. Feraud, on the other hand, returns to his solitary provincial imprisonment, walking disconsolately through the woods, never again to pursue his obsession of dueling.

== Cast ==
- Keith Carradine as Armand D'Hubert
- Harvey Keitel as Gabriel Feraud
- Albert Finney as Joseph Fouché, Minister of Police
- Edward Fox as Colonel Perteley, A Bonapartist Agent
- Cristina Raines as Adele, later D'Hubert's Wife
- Robert Stephens as Brigadier-General Treillard
- Tom Conti as Dr. Jacquin, An Army Surgeon and Friend of D'Hubert
- John McEnery as Feraud's Tall Second In The Final Duel
- Arthur Dignam as D'Hubert's One-Eyed Second In The Final Duel
- Diana Quick as Laura, D'Hubert's Mistress
- Alun Armstrong as Lieutenant Lecourbe, A Friend of D'Hubert
- Maurice Colbourne as Feraud's Second
- Gay Hamilton as Feraud's Mistress
- Meg Wynn Owen as Leonie, D'Hubert's Sister
- Jenny Runacre as Madame de Lionne, A Lady In Strasbourg
- Alan Webb as The Chevalier Du Rivarol, Adele's Uncle
- Matthew Guinness as The Mayor of Strasbourg's Nephew
- Dave Hill as Cuirassier
- William Hobbs as Swordsman
- W. Morgan Sheppard as The Fencing Master
- Liz Smith as The Fortune Teller
- Hugh Fraser as Officer
- Michael Irving as Officer
- Tony Matthews as Treillard's Aide-De-Camp
- Pete Postlethwaite as Treillard's Orderly
- Luke Scott as Léonie's Son
- Stacy Keach as the film narrator

== Production ==
=== Development ===
The Duellists would mark the feature film debut of Ridley Scott, who had previously made television commercials. Its visual style was influenced by Stanley Kubrick's historical drama Barry Lyndon (1975). In both films, duels play an essential role. In his commentary for the DVD release of the film, Scott comments that he was trying to emulate the lush cinematography of Kubrick's film, which approached the naturalistic paintings of the era depicted.

Due to budgetary constraints, Scott decided to shoot the film in a series of tableaux to indicate chapters of the story. The film was made with advice from military historian Richard Holmes.

=== Writing ===
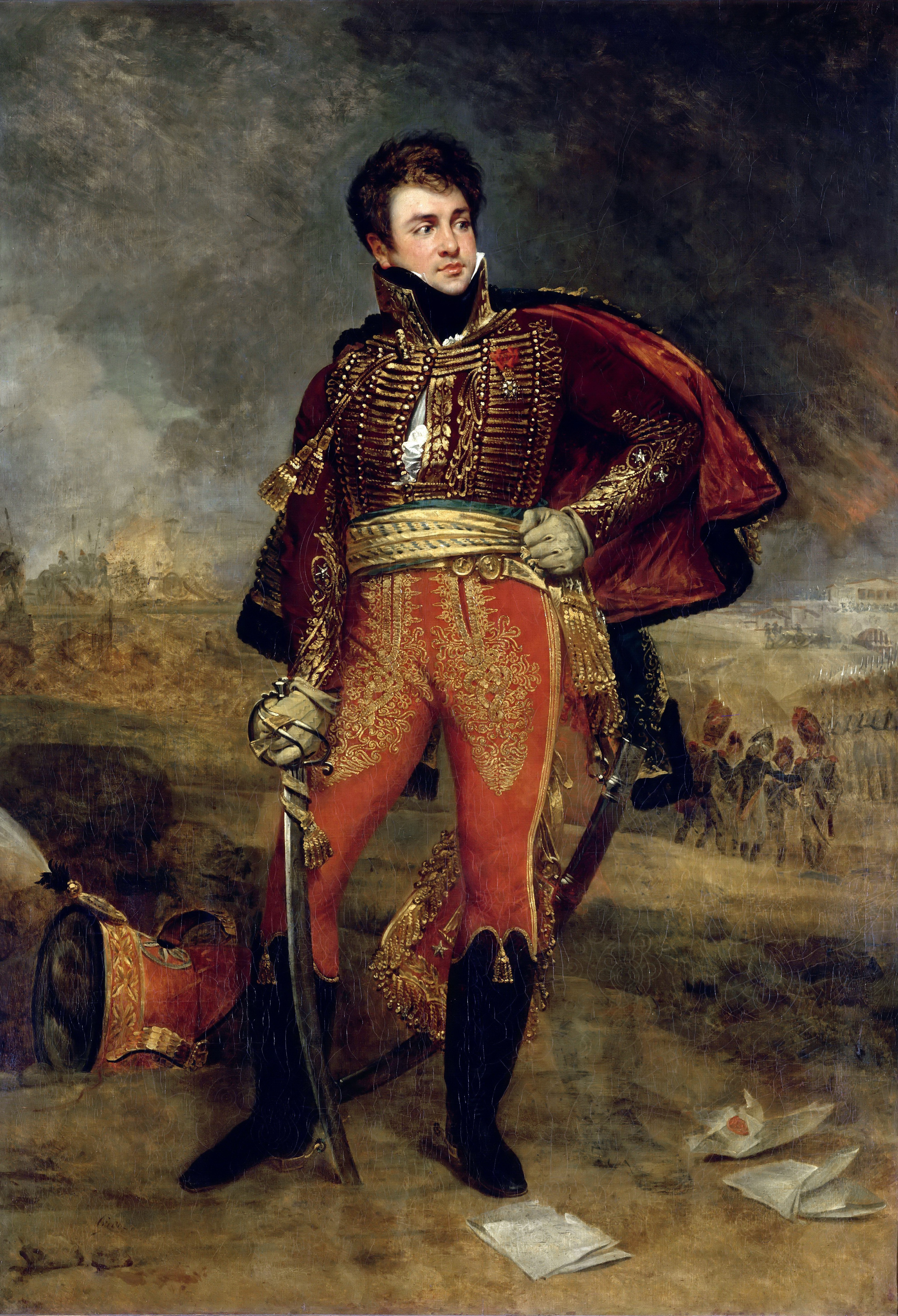
François Fournier-Sarlovèze, the basis for Feraud

Scott initially hired Gerald Vaughan-Hughes to write a story about Guy Fawkes and the 1605 Gunpowder Plot, but when financing fell through, Vaughan-Hughes adapted the screenplay from the 1907 novella The Duel by British-Polish writer Joseph Conrad. The genesis of Conrad's story were the real duels during the Napoleonic era between two officers in France's Grande Armée, Pierre Dupont de l'Étang and François Fournier-Sarlovèze, who became D’Hubert and Feraud in The Duel. In The Encyclopedia of the Sword, Nick Evangelista wrote:

As a young officer in Napoleon's Army, Dupont [l'Étang] was ordered to deliver a disagreeable message to a fellow officer, Fournier [Fournier-Sarlovèze], a rabid duellist. Fournier, taking out his subsequent rage on the messenger, challenged Dupont to a duel. This sparked a succession of encounters, waged with sword and pistol, that spanned decades. The contest was eventually resolved when Dupont was able to overcome Fournier in a pistol duel, forcing him to promise never to bother him again.

The pair fought their first duel in 1794 from which Fournier-Sarlovèze – known as the "worst subject of the Grande Armée" – demanded a rematch. At least another 30 rematches then occurred over the next 19 years in which the two officers fought mounted and on foot with swords, sabres, and pistols. After l'Étang finally bested Fournier-Sarlovèze in a duel, he told him to leave him alone for good. Fournier-Sarlovèze died aged 53; l'Étang lived until he was 74.

Although Vaughan-Hughes' screenplay used many elements from The Duel, it created new scenes like the duels at the start and the end of the film and new characters. It also moved the date of the first duel from 1794 to 1800. Alex von Tunzelmann speculates that this was an attempt to mirror Napoleon's life.

=== Casting ===
Scott's first choices to play the lead roles were Oliver Reed and Michael York, the stars of The Three Musketeers, but they proved unavailable or out of the film's budget range. Paramount Pictures gave Scott a list of four actors from which to choose for the two leads, which he had to agree to in order to receive financing. Scott selected Keith Carradine and Harvey Keitel, then spent several months trying to convince them to accept the roles. Carradine and Keitel, both Americans, chose not to adapt accents to match their British co-stars, believing their natural idiolects better reflected their character's class and ideological backgrounds. The leads insisted upon using real, un-dulled 1798-pattern light cavalry saber swords for the sword dueling sequences.

Even though he was out of the film's budget, Albert Finney agreed to appear in the film at the behest of this then-girlfriend Diana Quick. He filmed his scene in a single day, and took a case of champagne as payment.

=== Filming ===
Many exteriors were shot in and around Sarlat-la-Canéda in the Dordogne region of France. The winter scenes set during the retreat from Moscow were shot in the Cairngorms of Scotland, near Aviemore. The final duel scene was filmed at the unrestored Château de Commarque.

The last scene references paintings of the former emperor in his South Atlantic exile (e.g. Napoleon on Saint Helena by Franz Josef Sandmann).

== Critical reception ==
The film holds a 75% rating on Rotten Tomatoes based on 63 reviews, with an average score of 7.5/10 and the critical consensus: "Rich, stylized visuals work with effective performances in Ridley Scott's take on Joseph Conrad's Napoleonic story, resulting in an impressive feature film debut for the director." Metacritic, which uses a weighted average, assigned the film a score of 70 out of 100, based on 13 critics, indicating "generally favorable" reviews.

Vincent Canby of The New York Times wrote: "The movie, set during the Napoleonic Wars, uses its beauty much in the way that other movies use soundtrack music, to set mood, to complement scenes and even to contradict them. Sometimes it's all too much, yet the camerawork, which is by Frank Tidy, provides the Baroque style by which the movie operates on our senses, making the eccentric drama at first compelling and ultimately breathtaking." Pauline Kael of The New Yorker wrote, "The Duellists is an epic yarn; we sit back and observe it, and it's consistently entertaining—and eerily beautiful." Gene Siskel of the Chicago Tribune gave the film two-and-a-half stars out of four and wrote, "The story might have worked if there were an undercurrent of attractiveness to Keitel's loutish character. But he is an unwavering boor from start to finish, and his prowess with weapons is in no way redeeming." Variety wrote that Ridley Scott "does have an eye for fine compositions, period recreation and arresting tableaus. But it is somewhat surface and too taken up with poses… it rarely illuminates the deeper human aspects of these two flailing men."

Charles Champlin of the Los Angeles Times wrote that the sword fights were "the best I've ever seen" and called the story "refreshingly different from standard film content." Michael Webb of The Washington Post wrote, "The film has the pictorial beauty and rich period sense of Barry Lyndon (1975), but adds the narrative drive and passion that Kubrick's film lacked." David Ansen of Newsweek wrote, "The best you can say about the film – the directing debut of Ridley Scott – is that it provides an unusually civilized experience in these days of movie barbarism… The worst that can be said is that Keitel and Carradine are so perversely cast as French hussars that, whenever they speak, the splendid illusion of nineteenth-century Europe is shattered."

The film is lauded for its historically authentic portrayal of Napoleonic uniforms and military conduct, as well as its generally accurate early-19th-century fencing techniques as recreated by fight choreographer William Hobbs.

The film is included in the second edition of The New York Times Guide to the Best 1,000 Movies Ever Made, published in 2004.

Gregory Widen stated The Duellists was the inspiration for him to write Highlander.

=== Awards and nominations ===
Ceremony	Category	Nominee	Result
1977 Cannes Film Festival	Palme d'Or	Ridley Scott	Nominated
1977 Cannes Film Festival	Best First Work	Ridley Scott	Won
1978 British Society of Cinematographers Awards	Best Cinematography in a Theatrical Feature Film	Frank Tidy	Nominated
1978 David di Donatello Awards	Best Foreign Director	Ridley Scott	Won
32nd British Academy Film Awards	Best Cinematography	Frank Tidy	Nominated
32nd British Academy Film Awards	Best Costume Design	Tom Rand	Nominated

== Novelization ==
A novelization of the film by Gordon Williams, which included historical contexts and slightly expanded the plot, was published by Fontana Books in Great Britain in 1977 and by Pocket Books (ISBN 0-671-81930-5) in the United States in 1978.

== Home media ==
On 29 January 2013, Shout! Factory released the film on Blu-ray. The release coincided with the publication of an essay on the film in a collection of scholarly essays on Ridley Scott.

== Bibliography ==
- Barkman, Adam; Barkman, Ashley; Kang, Nancy, eds. (2013). The Culture and Philosophy of Ridley Scott. Rowman & Littlefield. ISBN 9780739178720.
- Mahon, James (2013). "A Double-Edged Sword: Honor in The Duellists". The Culture and Philosophy of Ridley Scott. pp. 45–60.
- Parrill, William B. (2011). Ridley Scott: A Critical Filmography. McFarland. ISBN 9780786485932.
