= B. H. Barry =

British actor and fight director

B. H. Barry is an English fight director and choreographer in theater, film, television, opera and ballet. He has been awarded a Drama Desk and an Obie Award for Sustained and Consistent Excellence in Stage Combat. He also received a Lifetime Achievement Tony Theater Wing. He received an award from the Outer Critic's Circle for his six-decade career and a Drama Desk for his fight in Camelot.

== Life and career ==
Born Barry Halliday in the English town of Staines, Barry was raised in a working-class family. He left school at fifteen, then worked at various jobs to pay for his drama school training, entering the Corona Stage Academy at the age of 19. He has since worked as fight director in a wide variety of theaters, including that of fight director for the Royal Shakespeare Company. He has created fights for over 40 shows on Broadway, including I Hate Hamlet.
