= Schola Gladiatoria =

Historical European martial arts group

External images
- A training session at the Schola
- A small-sword instructor at the FightCamp
- Longsword training
- Longsword training

Official logo of the Schola Gladiatoria

Schola Gladiatoria (SG) is a historical European martial arts (HEMA) group based in Ealing, west London, Great Britain, founded in 2001 and led by Matt Easton. It provides organized instruction in the serious study and practice of historical European swordplay. Schola seeks to be consistent with the methodology of the ancient European fencing schools by combining scholarship and research into the teachings of the historical masters (martial arts manuals), with the practical knowledge gained through solo and partnered drilling, and free play (sparring).

== History ==
Schola Gladiatoria was officially founded in 2001, though the founding members had been training with other HEMA organizations. The director of SG had first trained with the Company of Maisters, a group established in 1997 and led by Terry Brown, one of the HEMA pioneers in Great Britain. Later Matt Easton joined The Exiles and had been its co-director.

== Chapters and curriculum ==
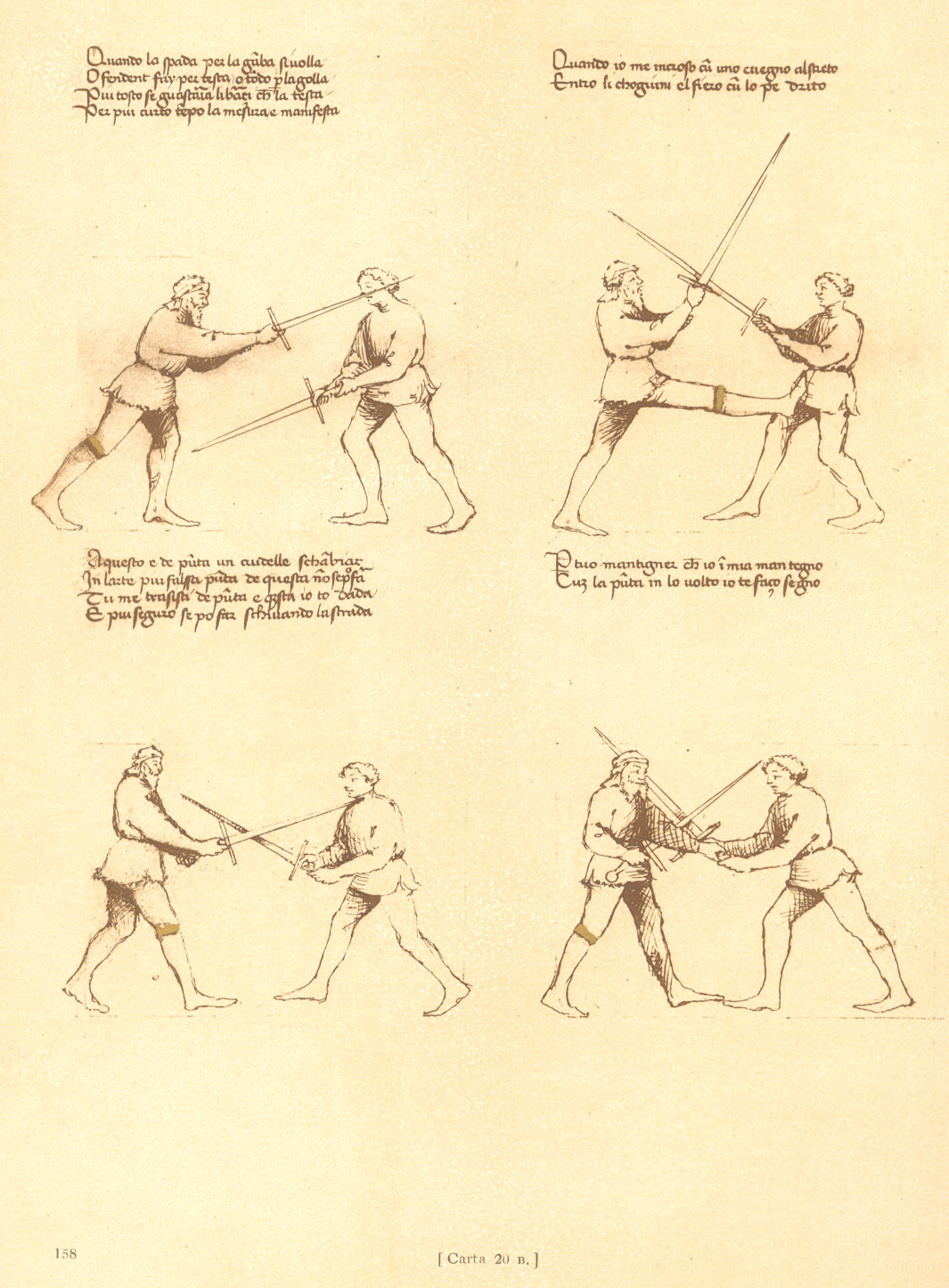
The Pisani-Dossi MS (1409)

The group has two chapters:

SG1 (in Ealing, west London)
Classes vary each week between four main subjects - Medieval longsword fencing (two-handed sword) according to Fiore dei Liberi (c.1380–1410); Medieval defence against dagger and dagger against dagger, also according to Fiore dei Liberi's system; Medieval/Renaissance one-handed sword and buckler fencing, according to various sources including Marozzo (1484–1553); and Victorian sabre fencing according to Professor John Musgrave Waite (c.1865–1884) and Captain Alfred Hutton (c.1861–1889). This chapter is taught by Matt Easton.
SG6 (in Bradford, West Yorkshire)
Concentrates on longsword according to various German sources in the Liechtenauer lineage (c.1380–1550), Georgian military sabre according to Charles Roworth (c.1798–1830), and rapier from a variety of sources. Classes also sometimes cover Tomahawk & Bowie, sword and buckler and dagger. This chapter is taught by Colin Fieldhouse, Chris Bentley, Richard Scholefield and Stephen Shepherd.

There have been other chapters over the years, some of which have now been closed, amalgamated or formed independent collaborative groups (hence the 'missing' numbers between SG1 and SG6).

== Rankings ==
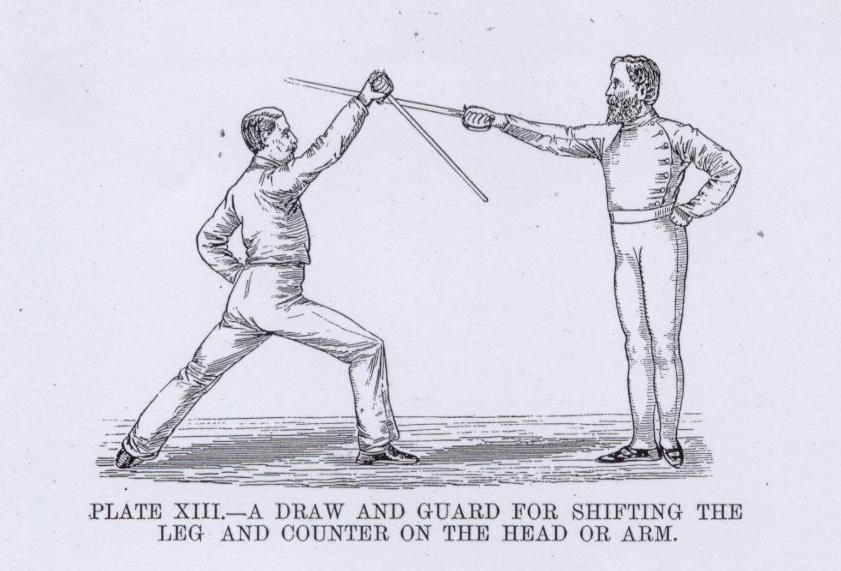
J M Waite Lessons in sabre... (1880)

Alfred Hutton Cold Steel (1889)

Schola uses ranks for its students and teachers. These are intended to help people focus on self-improvement, have something to aim towards, reward hard work, give more official responsibility to the experienced members and help classes run more smoothly. The following rankings are used: Novice, Scholar, Free Scholar, Provost and Senior Provost, roughly equating to the ranks of the London Company of Masters of Defence of the 16th century.

These ranks represent a combination of understanding of the art and ability to use it - the balance being more on knowledge and experience, rather than pure fighting ability. New students begin as Novices. Ranks are awarded by the director, with advice from the higher ranks. A degree of testing may be applied, involving theoretical and fighting parts: for instance in order to attain Free Scholar rank students are required to participate in a modern version of Prize Playing.

- Scholars are those students who are no longer considered beginners and have attained a certain level of knowledge and competency. They should be safe, have learned the basic principles of the art, be able to consistently perform basic techniques and should be able to explain what they are doing and why.
- Free Scholars are able to assist with teaching due to having trained for much longer and learned much more. They should have a much deeper understanding of the art and be able to convey that knowledge. Their martial abilities should be solid and proven.
- Provosts are able to regularly lead classes, present to large groups of people and exhibit notably deeper and broader levels of knowledge. They should have demonstrated their martial abilities widely.

== Programs and services ==
Member of HEMAC

Programs and services provided by Schola Gladiatoria:

- mentoring new HEMA clubs;
- developing and publishing curricula and original research;
- forging bonds with educational institutions;
- providing an optional ranking and instructor certification system;
- development of HEMA training equipment;
- support of HEMA research, teaching.

Members of Schola Gladiatoria have a track record in martial arts tournaments: Glorianna Cup (singlestick), BFHS longsword competition, HEMAC-Dijon longsword competition, FightCamp cutting competition, FightCamp Assault at Arms (singlestick), HEMAC-Dijon rapier competition, Dreynevent (Vienna) and Swordfish (Gothenburg).

Matt Easton and other members of Schola Gladiatoria have lectured and demonstrated at the Royal Armouries, the Tower of London, the Wallace Collection and the Kunsthistorisches Museum in Vienna, amongst other places.

In 2000 Schola was a founding part of HEMAC (Historical European Martial Arts Coalition), which is a pan-European organization of martial artists and researchers dedicated to the study of traditional European fighting arts and martial traditions. In 2006 SG joined the BFHS (British Federation for Historical Swordplay). It was among seven WMA groups which featured in a documentary called Reclaiming the Blade (2009). Also Schola has featured in several videos on longsword training, Victorian sabre sparring, created by WOMA TV (World of Martial Arts Television) (2012).

== FightCamp ==
Official logo of the Fightcamp

FightCamp is run by Matt Easton of Schola Gladiatoria (London). It has been running since 2004 and has grown from a small informal gathering at a historical site between a handful of groups to one of the largest international HEMA events in the world. In 2010 it was moved to a commercial site in the Midlands especially developed for such events. The event now attracts over 20 instructors and up to 200 students every year.

FightCamp is a three-day event - starting on Friday morning and ending on Sunday afternoon - providing classes, competitions, trading and the opportunity for free exchange of European martial arts and related subjects. Classes cover subjects such as medieval knightly combat - using weapons like longswords, daggers and pollaxes - through to renaissance rapier duelling, Baroque smallsword techniques, Georgian pugilism, Victorian bayonet practice and wrestling, and even modern self-protection and fitness classes.

== Forum ==
Schola Gladiatoria's homepage hosts an influential forum, dedicated to HEMA, swordsmanship, martial arts and military history. The forum is an important channel of community discussion within the group, also between the members of worldwide HEMA community, and currently has over 1800 registered users. It contains several discussion areas (sub-forums) on: general martial arts; Fiore dei Liberi; Johannes Liechtenauer; Victorian martial arts; modern self-protection & combatives; arms & armour, history, militaria, archaeology, art; historical missile martial arts; reviews; and

- a continuously updated, large database on free online fencing and martial treatises (some of the sources are hosted directly by SG):
  - early texts for martial technique interpretation (total: 14);
  - the 14th century treatises (total: 3);
  - the 15th century treatises (total: 31);
  - the 16th century treatises (total: 66);
  - the 17th century treatises (total: 82);
  - the 18th century treatises (total: 55);
  - the 19th century treatises (total: 233);
  - the 20th century treatises (total: 106).

== Publications ==
- Easton, Matthew. "Fior di Battaglia: The Martial Treatise of Fiore dei Liberi (c.1409)". Art and Arms: Florence, City of the Medici (The 2003 International Arms and Armour Conference Proceedings), Editor: Christopher Dobson, 2003, ISBN 0-9541633-1-1

== Affiliates ==
Schola maintains close fraternal ties to many different HEMA and WMA organizations. The following organizations are those with whom it collaborates to share resources and research and to cross-pollinate curriculum and methodology:

- Ars Ensis (Hungary);
- Gothenburg Historical Fencing School (GFHS) (Sweden).

== See also ==
- Fiore dei Liberi
- Johannes Liechtenauer
- Swordsmanship
- German school of swordsmanship
- Italian school of swordsmanship
- Historical European martial arts
