= Ars Ensis =

- Sport: Historical European Martial Arts
- Founded: 2010
- Headquarters: Győr
- Director: Szabolcs Waldmann (2010–)

Official website
- arsensis.hu
- (Hungary)

Ars Ensis is the largest Hungarian HEMA (historical European martial arts) association. It is a non-profit martial arts organization whose members research and teach mainly medieval and Renaissance historical European martial arts, based on period sources. The instructors of AE have been working on creating this HEMA community since 2003, and Ars Ensis has been operating as a Hungarian incorporated association since 2010.

Ars Ensis has participated at the HEMAC (Historical European Martial Arts Coalition) international gathering in Dijon, France and at FightCamp, UK, Starting from 2010 Ars Ensis participates at Great Sport Exhibition (Nagy Sportágválasztó in Hungarian), organized biannually in Budapest.

Ars Ensis publishes the only regular Hungarian HEMA magazine Kardlap.

Based on the syllabus of the fencing guilds of the German Renaissance, the longsword is the backbone of Ars Ensis' curriculum and its most essential weapon. The curriculum is divided into two educational periods:

1. a core curriculum which takes a minimum of four years to complete. During this period, the student has the possibility to participate at yearly prize playing events, attaining three ranks of Scholler (Scholar), viz. beginner, intermediate student, advanced student, designed to display the level of theoretical and practical fencing skills with different medieval and Renaissance weapons. The core curriculum is completed when a student passes a Free Scholler prize playing which is designed to show that the examinee will be able to continue to learn fencing independently.
2. the Provost curriculum, an additional three years of advanced fencing courses, during this period a Free Scholler has the opportunity to become immersed in study of individually chosen historical fencing schools and weapons, takes part in a comprehensive course designed to expand the student's historical knowledge.

Ars Ensis has concluded an agreement with London-based Schola Gladiatoria on the mutual recognition of prize playing ranks, especially the rank of Free Scholar.

In order to test members' fencing skills the association organizes an annual AE tournament called Lovagi Torna (Chivalric Tournament) held at different historic locations, for instance the old royal residence in Visegrád, and also a series of fencing opportunities called Liga (League) with its finals at the last training of a given year, AE's Christmas Workout.

The association certifies its own instructors, as of 2013 numbering 27, who are teaching students in 6 chapters at 14 different locations across Hungary in Budapest, Győr, Nagykanizsa, Sopron, Szeged, Tatabánya

Together with the Debrecen-based Anjou Udvari Lovagok Egyesülete ("Association of Anjou Court Knights") Ars Ensis in 2012 founded Magyar Hosszúkardvívó Sportszövetség ("Hungarian Longsword Fencing Sport Federation") in order to establish longsword fencing as a separate sport in Hungary.
