= Daniel McNicoll =

American film director

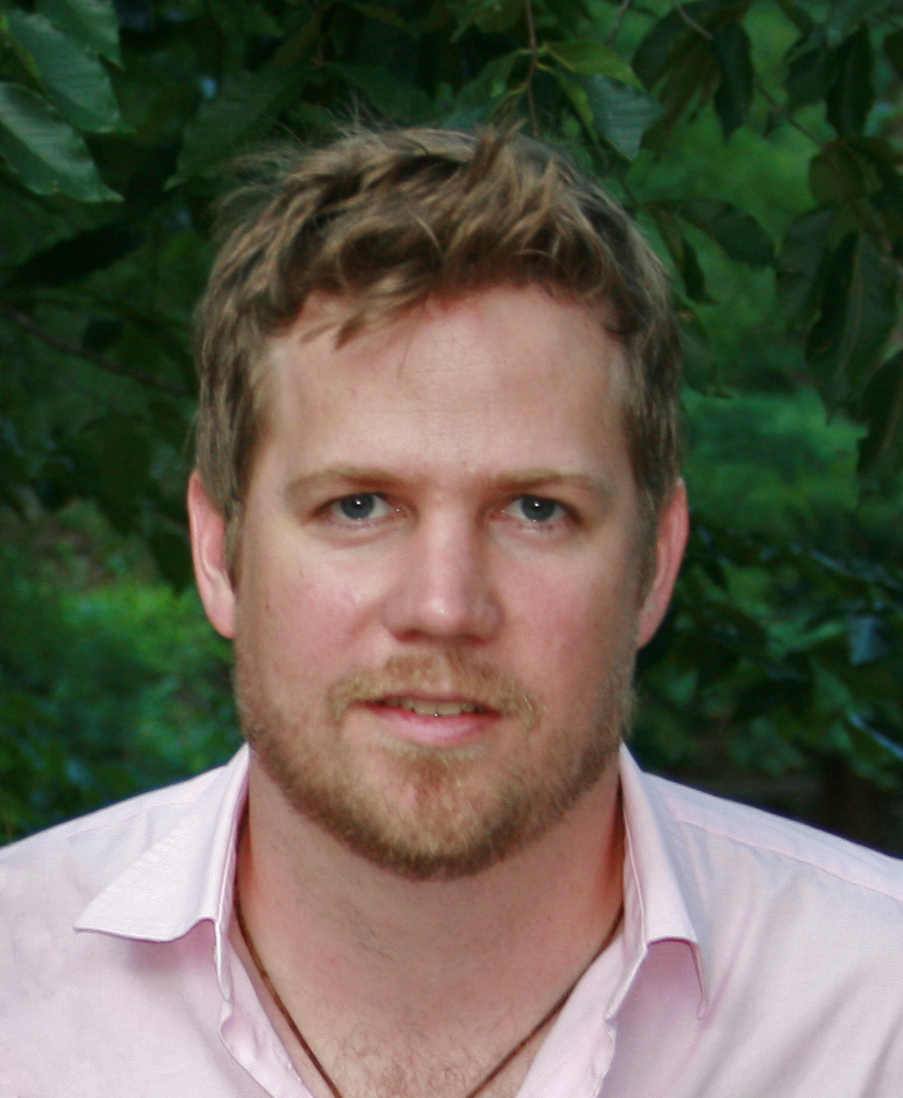
- Born: United States
- Occupation(s): Film director Film producer Screenwriter
- Years active: 2007–current

Daniel McNicoll is an American independent film producer, screenwriter and director, most known for his film, Reclaiming the Blade. Reclaiming the Blade was a number one movie rental on iTunes and was distributed by Starz and Anchor Bay Entertainment. The soundtrack for the film which included major label artists, an orchestral score and some of McNicoll's own music was released on Lakeshore Records. McNicoll's next film, Glastonbury: Isle of Light, as reported by the BBC and other sources, has found funding and will begin pre-production in mid-2018.

== Selected projects ==
| Year | Title | Role |
|---|---|---|
| 2007 | Love Suffers Long | recording artist, singer |
| 2008 | Lucy's Tasty Treasures | writer, director |
| 2009 | Reclaiming the Blade | director |
| 2010 | Word of Promise | voice for Man of God and King Ahaziah |
| 2011 | Hobbit in 5 | director |
| 2012 | Soundscapes of Middle-Earth | director |
| 2015 | Star Wars: Evolution of the Lightsaber Duel | co-producer |
| 2018 | Glastonbury: Isle of Light | screenwriter, producer |
