= Lightsaber =

Fictional sword

- Star Wars franchise element
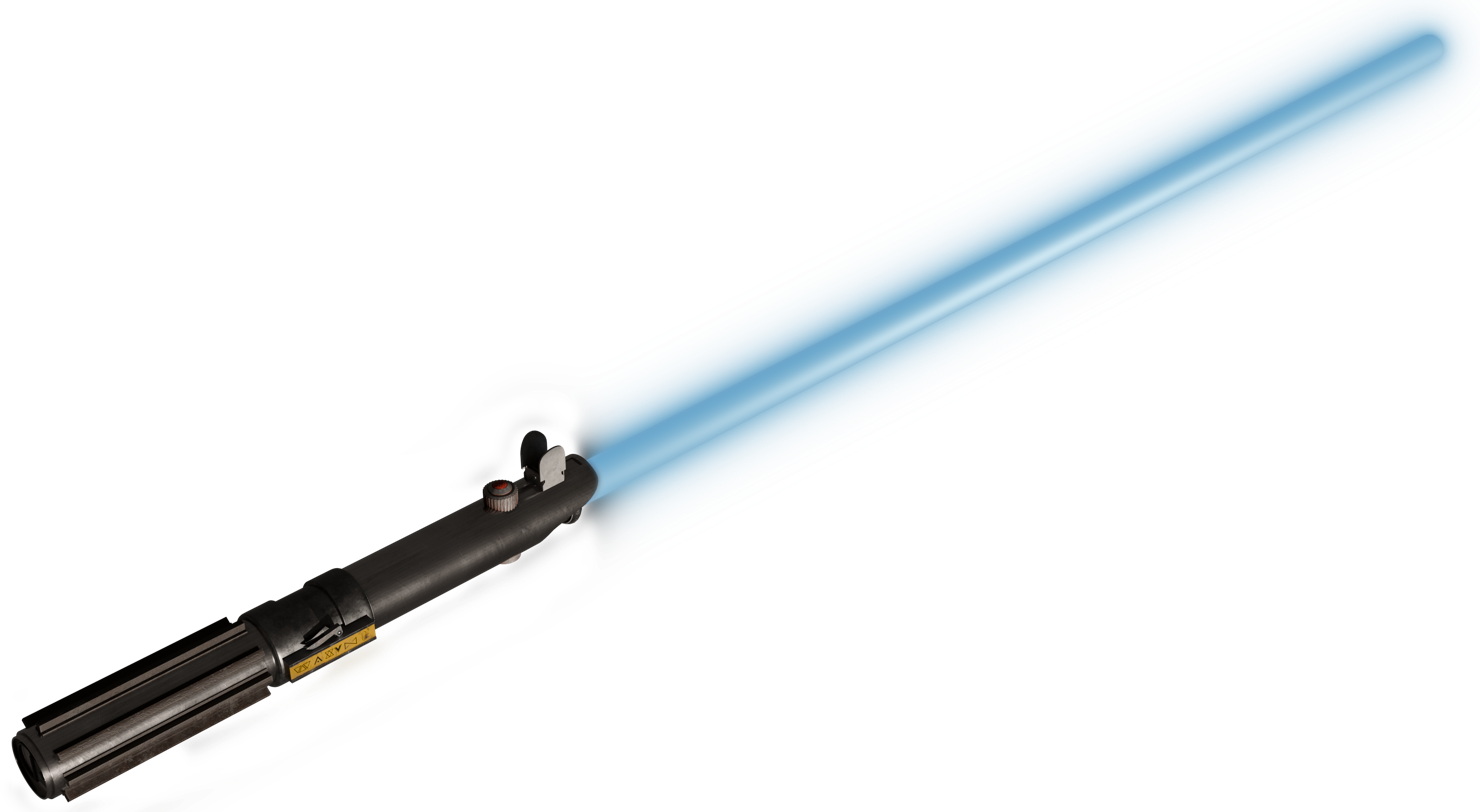
- Anakin Skywalker's lightsaber
- Publisher: Lucasfilm
- First appearance: Star Wars (1977)
- Created by: George Lucas
- Genre: Science fiction

In-universe information
- Type: Energy sword
- Function: Dueling; Blaster bolt deflection; Cutting through solid materials; Deflecting Force lightning; Light source
- Affiliation: Jedi; Sith; Inquisitorius; Knights of Ren; Mandalorians (Darksaber)

A lightsaber is a fictional energy sword featured in the Star Wars franchise. A typical lightsaber is shown as a luminous laser sword about 3 feet (0.91 m) in length emitted from a metal hilt around 10.5 inches (27 cm) in length. Introduced in the original Star Wars film, (Note: Later titled Star Wars: Episode IV – A New Hope) it has since appeared in 12 of the 13 theatrical Star Wars films, with at least one lightsaber duel occurring in each installment of the "Skywalker Saga". The lightsaber's distinct appearance was created using rotoscoping for the original films, and with digital effects for the prequel and sequel trilogies.

In the Star Wars universe, the lightsaber is the signature weapon of both the light side-wielding Jedi Order and the dark side-wielding Sith Order, though it can be used as an ordinary weapon or tool by any individual, regardless of their Force sensitivity. The Jedi use lightsabers of various colors, typically blue, green and—to a lesser extent—yellow, orange and purple, while the Sith wield red-bladed sabers to distinguish themselves from the Jedi. The color of a lightsaber's blade is given by its kyber crystal, which powers the blade and whose color is determined by the user's connection to the Force. A lightsaber's hilt is built by its wielder and is, therefore, unique in design. There are several variations outside of the traditional single-bladed lightsaber, such as the double-bladed lightsaber (most famously wielded by Darth Maul), the curved-hilted lightsaber (wielded by Count Dooku and Asajj Ventress), the crossguard lightsaber (used by Kylo Ren and occasionally by Jedi), and the Darksaber, forged by the Mandalorian Jedi Tarre Vizsla and primarily wielded by the non-Force-sensitive rulers of the planet Mandalore (including Pre Vizsla and Bo-Katan Kryze).

An active lightsaber gives off a distinctive hum, which rises in pitch and volume as the blade is moved rapidly through the air. As presented in the early films, the blade can cut, burn, and melt through most substances with little resistance. Lightsabers can deflect blaster bolts, allowing a wielder with Jedi reflexes to turn an enemy's own gunfire against them. It can be deflected by another lightsaber blade, which produces a loud crackle; by energy shields; or by the metals beskar (found in Mandalorian armor) and phrik (the metal used to create electrostaffs). Some exotic saber-proof melee weapons have been introduced in the Star Wars Expanded Universe as well as later episodic films. The blade has been used to weld metal, and has been shown to leave both cauterized wounds and bleeding wounds in flesh.

The lightsaber has become one of the most widely recognized elements of the Star Wars franchise. In 2008, a survey of about 2,000 film fans found it to be the most popular weapon in film history.

== Prop construction ==
Covered with millions of tiny glass beads, [Scotchlite] has the property of reflecting light directly back to its source. It's the same material used for reflective road signs [and lightsaber props].

— Special Effects: An Introduction to Movie Magic

For the original Star Wars film, the film prop hilts were constructed by Roger Christian from old Graflex press camera flash battery packs and other pieces of hardware, while special effects that brought the blade to life on screen were made by John Stears. The full-sized sword props were designed to appear ignited onscreen, by later creating an "in-camera" glowing effect in post-production. The blade is a three-sided rod which was coated with a Scotchlite retroreflector array, the same sort used for highway signs. A lamp was positioned to the side of the taking camera and reflected towards the subject through 45-degree angled glass so that the sword would appear to glow from the camera's point of view.

Set decorator Roger Christian found the handles for the Graflex Flash Gun in a photography shop in Great Marlborough Street, in London's West End. He then added cabinet T-track to the handles, securely attaching them with cyanoacrylate glue. Adding a few "greebles" (surface details), Christian managed to hand-make the first prototype of a lightsaber prop for Luke Skywalker before production began. George Lucas decided he wanted to add a clip to the handle, so that Luke could hang it on his belt. Once Lucas felt the handle was up to his standards, it went to John Stears to create the wooden dowel rod with front-projection paint so that the animators would have a glow of light to enhance later on in post production. Due to lack of preparation time, Christian's prototype and a second spare were used for the shooting in Tunisia, where filming on Star Wars began. It was discovered, however, that the glowing effect was greatly dependent on the rod's orientation to the camera, and during the Obi-Wan Kenobi/Darth Vader duel, they could clearly be seen as rods. Because of this, the glow would be added in post-production through rotoscoping, which also allowed for diffusion to be employed to enhance the glow.

While original trilogy hilts were typically constructed using found parts, during the prequel and sequel trilogies a different process was sometimes used. Hilts were first machined out of metal materials. Then casts would be made using the metal hilts to create resin copies that were used on screen. The resin was often molded over a metal rod that a dueling blade could be attached to for fight sequences.

=== Visual effects ===
Korean animator Nelson Shin, who was working for DePatie–Freleng Enterprises at the time, was asked by his manager if he could animate the lightsaber in the live-action scenes of a film. After Shin accepted the assignment, the live-action footage was given to him. He drew the lightsabers with a rotoscope, an animation which was superimposed onto the footage of the physical lightsaber blade prop. Shin explained to the people from Lucasfilm that since a lightsaber is made of light, the sword should look "a little shaky" like a fluorescent tube. He suggested inserting one frame that was much lighter than the others while printing the film on an optical printer, making the light seem to vibrate. Shin also recommended adding a degausser sound on top of the other sounds for the weapon since the sound would be reminiscent of a magnetic field. The whole process took one week, surprising his company. Lucasfilm showed Shin the finished product, having followed his suggestions to use an X-Acto knife to give the lightsaber a very sharp look, and to have sound accompany the weapon's movements.

=== Sound ===
The lightsaber sound effect was developed by sound designer Ben Burtt as a combination of the hum of idling interlock motors in aged movie projectors and interference caused by a television set on a shieldless microphone. Burtt discovered the latter accidentally as he was looking for a buzzing, sparking sound to add to the projector-motor hum.

The pitch changes of lightsaber movement were produced by playing the basic lightsaber tone on a loudspeaker and recording it on a moving microphone, generating Doppler shift to mimic a moving sound source.

== Depiction ==
Lightsabers were present in the earliest drafts as mundane plasma weapons that were used alongside laser guns. The introduction of the Force in a later revision made the Jedi and the Sith supernaturally skilled; initially, they were only portrayed as swordsmen. The lightsaber became the Force-user's tool, described in A New Hope by Obi-Wan Kenobi as "not as clumsy or random as a blaster. An elegant weapon, for a more civilized age". The source of a lightsaber's power is a kyber crystal. These crystals are also the power source of the Death Star's superlaser.

In films such as Revenge of the Sith and The Last Jedi, melee weapons such as the electrostaff and plasma-lined blades deflect lightsabers.

=== Types ===
Lightsabers are depicted as hand-built as part of a Jedi's or Sith's training regimen. Each lightsaber is unique, though some may bear resemblance to others, especially if there is a connection between the builders. The hilt of most lightsabers is straight and predominantly cylindrical, though there are other lightsaber hilt types. The first film appearance of a dual-bladed lightsaber (first depicted in the comic series Tales of the Jedi) was in The Phantom Menace, wielded by Darth Maul; it consists of two regular lightsabers joined at their butt ends each producing a blade independently. Count Dooku, beginning with the character's first appearance in Attack of the Clones, is shown to have a lightsaber with a curved hilt. The video game Star Wars: The Force Unleashed introduced two other variants: a lightsaber pike (a lightsaber with a shorter blade but a long handle, resembling a spear) and a Tonfa-style lightsaber with right-angle hilt. Additionally, in several spin-off series such as The Clone Wars and Rebels, special variants of the lightsaber have been depicted - such as the lightsaber-blaster wielded by Ezra Bridger.

The Star Wars expanded universe adds several lightsaber types, including short and dual-phase (adjustable length) weapons. In Star Wars Rebels, Ezra Bridger's original lightsaber is a hybrid that features a fully functional blaster pistol built into the handle. Kylo Ren, introduced in The Force Awakens, uses a lightsaber that features two crosshilt blades, giving it the appearance of a greatsword. His blade also has an unstable, fiery appearance, explained in canon reference books as stemming from a cracked kyber crystal. The Inquisitors of the Galactic Empire are depicted as wielding a unique variation of a double-bladed saber, mounted on a rotating ring enabling the blades 360 degrees of rotation and short-term flight capability. More obscure lightsaber variations, such as the "lightwhip", an elongated flexible blade used in a manner akin to a whip, the "lightclub", an enlarged standard lightsaber, and the "shoto", a dramatically smaller variation often paired with a standard sized saber have also made appearances. A lightsaber-sniper rifle hybrid known as the Farkiller was made over a millennium prior to the Imperial Era, and was used in an attempt to assassinate Palpatine.

=== Colors ===
Lightsabers in the first two released films, A New Hope and The Empire Strikes Back, had blades that were either blue (for the Jedi) or red (for the Sith). Luke Skywalker's new lightsaber in Return of the Jedi was colored blue during the initial editing of the film, and appears so in both an early movie trailer and the official theatrical posters; it was later changed to green in the film's final edit after initial viewings and screen tests by the filmmakers, who felt that it would better stand out against the blue sky of Tatooine in outdoor scenes, and this color change is also reflected in the film's re-release posters. Mace Windu's purple-bladed lightsaber, as first seen in Attack of the Clones, was requested by the actor Samuel L. Jackson, who believed the color, which is his personal favorite, would make his character be easily recognized among other Jedi. (Note: Ki-Adi-Mundi and Saesee Tiin had previously been depicted in spin-off works with purple lightsabers.) Jackson is known to frequently request that the characters he plays use an item that is purple in color. The Clone Wars showed the guardians of the Jedi Temple wielding yellow-bladed lightsabers, and, at the end of The Rise of Skywalker, Rey is shown to have built a yellow-bladed lightsaber using part of her staff as the hilt.

As depicted in The Clone Wars and Rebels, the builder of a lightsaber finds a kyber crystal and meditates with it until the crystal acquires a color. The color of this crystal becomes the blade's color when installed into a lightsaber hilt. In the book Star Wars: Ahsoka and the comic series Darth Vader: Dark Lord of the Sith, it is shown that dark side users remove the crystal from a defeated Jedi's lightsaber and concentrate Force energy on it to break its connection to the light side, a process known as "bleeding" to create a red crystal. The process can also be reversed, as shown in Ahsoka, when the titular character does so to a pair of crystals taken from an Inquisitor. She uses them in the pair of white-bladed lightsabers she builds at the end of the novel.

Other colors have appeared in various expanded media projects, including many video games where the player can select their character's lightsaber color.

==== Darksaber ====
The Darksaber is a unique lightsaber that has a distinct black blade with a white halo, introduced in Star Wars: The Clone Wars (2008) and subsequently appearing in Star Wars Rebels, where it is described as an ancient lightsaber created by Tarre Vizla, the first Mandalorian to become a Jedi, and later serves as a symbol of Mandalorian authority in the hands of Bo-Katan Kryze. According to Mandalorian tradition, the weapon cannot simply be given; it must be won from a defeated combatant. It subsequently appears briefly in the hands of Moff Gideon in the season one finale of The Mandalorian, to whom Kryze had previously surrendered the weapon. By the end of the second season's finale, it belongs to series protagonist Din Djarin, who bested Gideon for it. In the second episode of the show's third season, the weapon nominally returns to Kryze's ownership, after she defeats a cyborg creature that captured Djarin, though the latter retains possession of it. Kryze officially reclaims the blade in the season's sixth episode, before it is ultimately destroyed by Gideon in the season finale.

=== Choreography ===
The technical lightsaber choreography for the original Star Wars trilogy was developed by Hollywood sword-master Bob Anderson. Anderson personally trained Mark Hamill (Luke Skywalker) and, in The Empire Strikes Back and Return of the Jedi, performed all the stunts as Darth Vader during the lightsaber duels wearing Vader's costume. Anderson's role in the trilogy was highlighted in the film Reclaiming the Blade where he shared his experiences as a fencer developing the lightsaber techniques for the three original movies.

The lightsaber duels in the Star Wars prequel trilogy were specifically choreographed by stunt-coordinator Nick Gillard to be miniature "stories". For these films, Gillard was the primary sword instructor for Liam Neeson (Qui-Gon Jinn), Ewan McGregor (Obi-Wan Kenobi), Ray Park (Darth Maul) and Hayden Christensen (Anakin Skywalker / Darth Vader) among other actors. His goal in choreographing the action for The Phantom Menace was to create stunts that flow from the story; "You can't just think, 'I'm a stunt coordinator, I'm going to make a big stunt happen'," Gillard said. "It's all about making it tie in nicely with the film so that you don't notice the stunts."

In writing the prequel trilogy, George Lucas said he wanted the lightsaber combat to be "reminiscent of what had been done in the previous films but also something that was more energized. We'd seen old men, young boys, and characters who were half-droid, but we'd never seen a Jedi in his prime. I wanted to do that with a fight that was faster and more dynamic—and we were able to pull that off."

According to Gillard, various lightsaber combat styles, or forms, were devised for the prequels and intended to further characterize their practitioners.

I developed different styles for the characters, and gave each of them a flaw or a bonus. So with Obi-Wan Kenobi, for instance, he's got a very business-like style—when he was younger he could border on the flashy and might twirl his lightsaber a bit, because he was taught by Qui-Gon. Qui-Gon was brash, that rubbed off on Obi-Wan and Obi-Wan then taught Anakin, who was way too old to learn anyway... I think the style really worked well. The Jedi style of fighting is an amalgamation of all the great swordfighting styles. Melding them together is the difficult part—to move from a Kendo style to, say, rapier requires a complete change in body and feet movement, and this must look effortless. The style moves seamlessly between the different disciplines, but remains technically correct throughout.

For The Phantom Menace, Gillard set out certain styles and faults for the saber-wielding characters. He added that the Jedi's use of such "a short-range weapon" meant "they would have to be very good at it"; combining a variety of disciplines from various sword fighting styles to martial arts "with a touch of tennis and tree chopping", he created the style seen in the Episode I lightsaber battles.

For The Force Awakens, director J. J. Abrams decided to approach the choreography similarly to how it was done in the original trilogy. Abrams stated that the prequel trilogy choreography was "increasingly spectacular and stylized, almost like dance choreography", but that was not what they really wanted to go for in the new films. He told Empire magazine, "When you look at Star Wars and Empire, they are very different lightsaber battles, but for me they felt more powerful because they were not quite as slick. I was hoping to go for something much more primitive, aggressive and rougher, a throwback to the kind of heart-stopping lightsaber fights I remembered being so enthralled by as a kid."

== Cultural impact ==
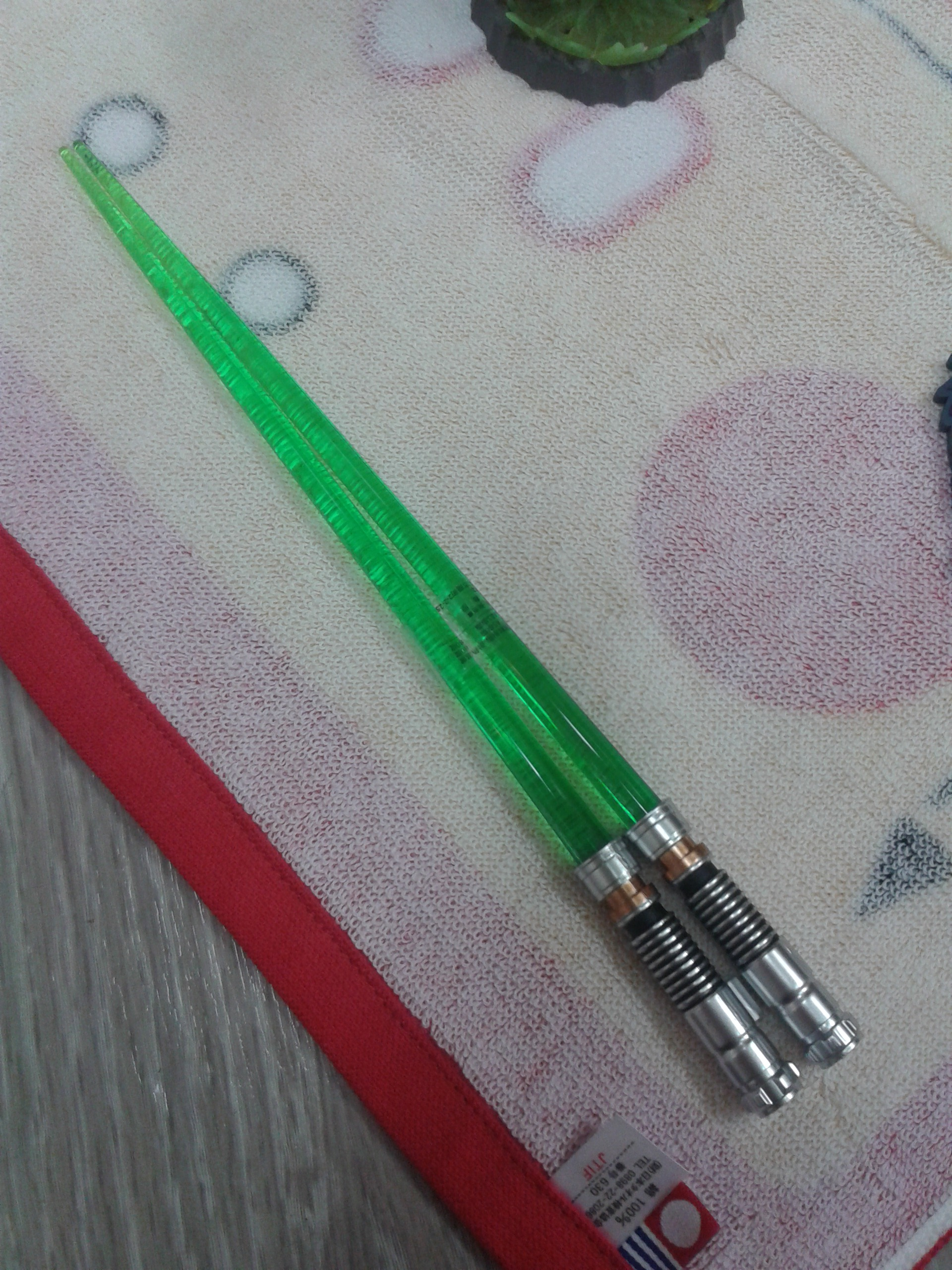
Lightsaber chopsticks

=== Merchandise ===
Over the years, advancements in technology have allowed for the creation of increasingly immersive and realistic lightsaber replicas.

==== Disney Parks ====
Disneyland in California sells lightsaber-themed churros outside its Star Tours attraction.

Disneyland and Disney World (Hollywood Studios) also sell legacy lightsabers which are replicas of the lightsabers seen used by the Jedi, Sith, and other warriors in the movies and television shows such as Darth Vader, Obi-Wan Kenobi, Rey Skywalker, Count Dooku, and Kylo Ren.

Disneyland and Hollywood Studios also offer Savi's Workshop, a place where guests can build their own lightsaber and choose their own kyber crystal, thereby changing the blade color of their own unique lightsaber.

Besides Savi's Workshop, there is another custom lightsaber experience. The Star Trader at Disneyland offers guests a chance to build their own lightsabers, without first paying 200 dollars for the experience.

=== Attractions ===
The Jedi Training: Trials of the Temple is a live show where children are selected to learn the teachings of the Jedi Knights, the Force, and the basics of Lightsaber combat to become Padawan learners. The show is present at the Rebels stage next to Star Tours – The Adventures Continue attraction at Disney's Hollywood Studios and at the Tomorrowland Terrace at Disneyland. Additionally, the now defunct Star Wars: Galactic Starcruiser incorporated lightsaber training for each guest aboard the spacecraft during their stay. The training was led by a Saja cast members and taught the fourth form of lightsaber combat, Ataru, to the guests. Both lightsabers and shields were used during training since the guests learn to use Ataru to deflect incoming projectiles. There was no lightsaber-to-lightsaber combat in the attraction and guests had to be at least seven years old to participate.

=== Similar weapons ===
The virtual reality rhythm game Beat Saber involves the player using two lightsabers in order to slash a series of oncoming cubes.

In Kamen Rider Black RX, the main character, Rider RX also known as Kotaro Minami, uses his lightsaber-ish weapon "Revolcane" to fight the Crisis Empire, a terrorist organization.

In Saban's Masked Rider, the main character, known as Dex Stewart, uses his lightsaber-ish weapon "Electro Saber" to fight Masked Rider's foes.

In Andor, Luthen Rael's Fondor haulcraft is equipped with two beam emitters that deploy stable and sustained laser bolts like those of a lightsaber. These beam weapons are highly effective at slicing enemy starfighters at close range, but they take a relatively long time to charge.

==== Parodies ====
In the 1987 film Spaceballs by Mel Brooks, "the Schwartz" is a play on "the Force", from Star Wars. The lightsabers emanate from the Schwartz-rings, rather than a hilt. The cartoon series Futurama features many lightsaber-style weapons, notably expanding batons used by police. The batons glow and "whoosh" with a lightsaber's distinctive hum, but are used to beat people. In Jim Butcher's Dresden Files novel series, medical examiner and Star Wars fan Waldo Butters wields one of the three holy Swords of the Cross, which re-fashions itself into a lightsaber upon accepting him as its owner. In Yuya Sato's Danganronpa: Togami light novel trilogy, main antagonist Orvin Elevator / Kazuya Togami wields a lightsaber built into their prosthetic arm, to which they are berated for copyright infringement by Genocider Syo / Genocide Jack; in the anime Danganronpa 3: The End of Hope's Peak High School, this same lightsaber is instead depicted as a flaming mechanical katana wielded by Kyosuke Munakata.

=== Games ===
With the advent of motion-controlled video games, players were given the opportunity to wield an in-game lightsaber with their own hands. In the seventh generation of video game consoles, there were several Star Wars video games available on the Wii (Lego Star Wars: The Complete Saga, Star Wars: The Force Unleashed, Star Wars: The Clone Wars – Lightsaber Duels, Star Wars: The Clone Wars – Republic Heroes and Lego Star Wars III: The Clone Wars) and one on the Xbox 360 (Kinect Star Wars) that utilized motion controls to wield a lightsaber through arm gestures. Unleashed and Duels, both developed by Krome Studios, have more precise control of the lightsaber, allowing players to swing it in any of five different directions (up, down, left, right or forward) with the Wii Remote, while Kinect takes advantage of the eponymous, camera-based motion controller to grant the player a more fluid, one-to-one control method of swinging the lightsaber.

Prior to the seventh generation, there were also a few earlier Star Wars games that used gesture-based control to simulate lightsaber combat, such as the two bonus levels of the arcade game Star Wars Trilogy, where the player controls Luke Skywalker as he wields his lightsaber against Boba Fett and Darth Vader in Return of the Jedi by pushing a joystick in one of eight directions to follow on-screen offensive and defensive cues, and a TV game released around the time Revenge of the Sith came to theaters, titled Star Wars: Saga Edition – Lightsaber Battle Game, in which the player swings a lightsaber-shaped controller to deflect blaster bolts from infantry (such as battle droids and clone troopers) and duel against characters from across the saga.

By the time Disney purchased Lucasfilm, new technological advances made augmented reality possible, leading to the creation of some more notable motion-controlled lightsaber video games that took advantage of that feature. One of them came in the form of a special activity mode in the official Star Wars fan app on iOS and Android in which players use their smartphone's motion sensors to practice and master blaster deflection with a training droid (which appears on the phone's rear camera), similar to the deflection training exercises featured aboard the Millennium Falcon in A New Hope, while progressing through the ranks of the Jedi or Sith order. Another is in Star Wars: Jedi Challenges, which works with a Lenovo Mirage AR headset, a tracking sensor and a dedicated lightsaber controller that launched in December 2017. One of the multiple game modes available in Challenges, which was jointly developed by Disney and Lenovo, enables players to confront Star Wars villains in lightsaber duels, such as Darth Maul and Kylo Ren.

== See also ==
- Flaming sword (mythology)
- List of Star Wars weapons
- Physics and Star Wars
- Photonic molecule
- Star Wars: Evolution of the Lightsaber Duel
