= Provost (martial arts) =

In the 16th-century, London-based Corporation of Masters of the Noble Science of Defence (or "Company of Masters") Provost was the third of four ranks, the others being Scholar, Free Scholar, and Master. A Free Scholar could not be accredited as a Provost until they had studied under a registered Master for seven years (though this time requirement was occasionally shortened). Acquiring the rank of Provost required a gruelling Prize Playing with a variety of swords and other weapons, followed by a formal oath. Provosts were allowed to accept students and open their own fighting schools.

Provost is also used as a rank in Historical European martial arts organisations, such as the Association for Renaissance Martial Arts, and the Manx Academies of Arms, Armour & Defensive Arts, which base their ranking systems on that of the London Company of Masters.
