= Reclaiming the Blade =

- Directed by: Daniel McNicoll
- Produced by: Erica Black; Daniel McNicoll
- Starring: Viggo Mortensen; Karl Urban; Bob Anderson
- Narrated by: John Rhys-Davies
- Music by: David James Nielsen
- Distributed by: Galatia Films Home Entertainment (US)
- Release date: July 7, 2009
- Running time: 78 minutes
- Country: United States
- Language: English

Reclaiming the Blade is a 2009 documentary written and directed by Daniel McNicoll and produced by Galatia Films on the topic of swords. Reclaiming the Blade was a number one movie rental on iTunes. The feature-length film was distributed by Starz and Anchor Bay Entertainment.

Notable interviewees from the film industry include Viggo Mortensen, Karl Urban, Richard Taylor, and Hollywood sword master Bob Anderson (fencing instructor to Errol Flynn, Antonio Banderas, Mortensen, Urban and Johnny Depp among others). Interviewed as an expert on swordmaking was bladesmith Paul Champagne.

Narration is by British actor John Rhys-Davies. The documentary was produced with the support of Peter Jackson, Weta Workshop, Skywalker Sound and the Royal Armouries.

The soundtrack for the film, which included major label artists and an orchestral score from David James Nielsen, was released on Lakeshore Records. Commentary track from director Daniel McNicoll and John Rhys-Davies included details on the making of the film and Rhys-Davies experiences with swordplay on the London stage.

Seven Western martial arts (WMA) groups located in five countries in Europe provide footage for Reclaiming the Blade: Arts of Mars (Germany), Boar's Tooth Fight School (UK), De Taille et d'Estoc (France), Ringschule Wrocław, ARMA-PL (Poland), Schola Gladiatoria (UK), Stockholm's Historical Fencing Society (Sweden), The School of Traditional Medieval Fencing (UK).

== Critical response ==
The New York Post said, "Hardcore gamers into cyber swordplay — or any Lord of the Rings geeks out there, for that matter — ought to check out the interesting new documentary film" and that it was "an in-depth documentary on the culture and craft of swords and their role in entertainment". The Association for Renaissance Martial Arts said, "This is an unprecedented effort very well put together, entertaining as well as informative." But felt it "doesn't fully portray the fact that the legitimate revival of historical European fencing actually requires acknowledging the need for 'reclaiming the blade' from the usual suspects... stunt fencing, sport game, and escapist role-play." Marina Antunes on RowThree.com said, "What begins as a look at the art of the sword on film quickly transforms into a history lesson on the loss, the find and the eventual re-emergence and rise of traditional western martial arts, an art form that had been lost for centuries." Adding it is "an informative, engaging and entertaining documentary that sheds light on a subject that most of us see constantly but know nothing about".

== See also ==
- Historical European Martial Arts
- Combat in film
