= John Rhys-Davies =

Welsh actor (born 1944)

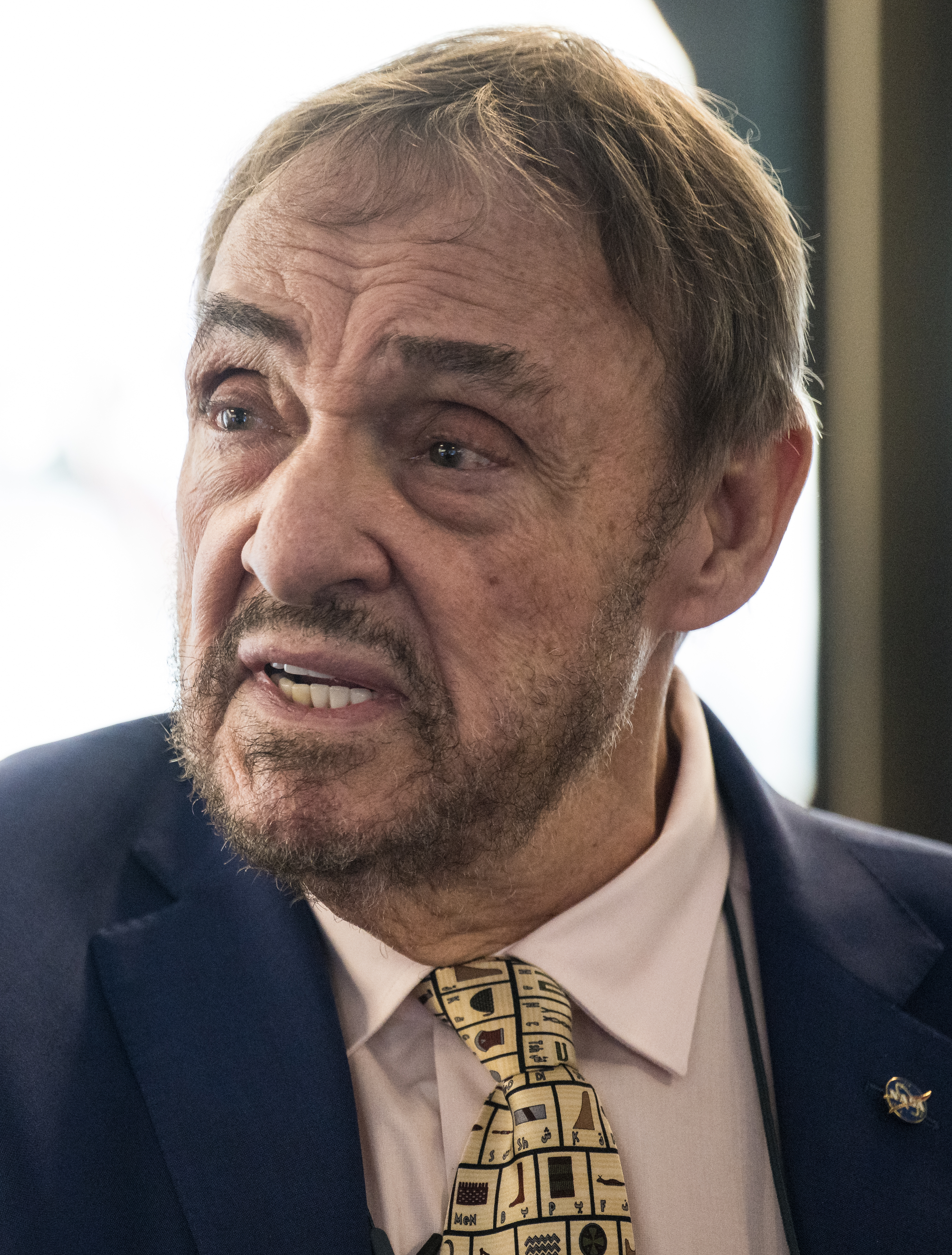
- Rhys-Davies in 2025
- Born: 5 May 1944 (age 82); Salisbury, Wiltshire, England
- Education: University of East Anglia
- Occupation: Actor
- Years active: 1964–present
- Spouse: Suzanne Wilkinson (m. 1966; died 2010)
- Partner: Lisa Manning (2004–present)
- Children: 3

Signature
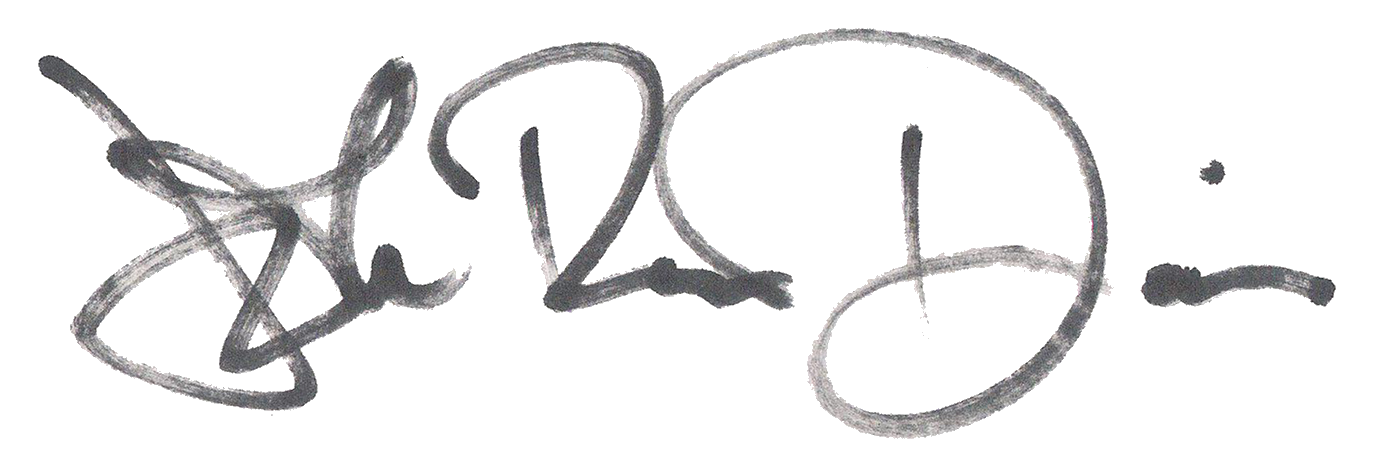

John Rhys-Davies (born 5 May 1944) is a Welsh actor known for portraying Gimli in The Lord of the Rings trilogy and Sallah in the Indiana Jones franchise. He has received three Screen Actors Guild Award nominations, with one win, and a Primetime Emmy Award nomination.

Rhys-Davies is also known for his performances in the films Sahara (1983), The Living Daylights (1987), Glory Daze (1995), The Medallion (2003) and One Night with the King (2006). He is also known for his extensive voice work including Cats Don't Dance (1997), Sinbad: Beyond the Veil of Mists (2000), SpongeBob SquarePants (2000–2002), and TripTank (2015–2016).

Rhys-Davies also gained acclaim for his television roles as Macro in I, Claudius (1976), Vasco Rodrigues in Shōgun (1980), and Michael Malone in The Untouchables (1993). From 1995 to 1997, he portrayed Professor Maximillian Arturo in Sliders.

== Early life ==
John Rhys-Davies was born in Salisbury on 5 May 1944, the son of Welsh parents. His mother, Phyllis Jones, was a nurse, while his father, Rhys Davies, was a mechanical engineer and colonial officer.

Due to his father's work as a colonial police officer, Rhys-Davies was raised in Tanganyika (today part of Tanzania) before his family moved to the Welsh town of Ammanford. While in Tanganyika, his family lived in places such as Dar es Salaam, Kongwa, Moshi, and Mwanza. Rhys-Davies was educated at independent Truro School in Cornwall and then at the University of East Anglia, where he was one of the first 105 students admitted and became a co-founder of its drama club. After a stint teaching at a secondary school in Watton, Norfolk, Rhys-Davies won a place at the Royal Academy of Dramatic Art in London.

== Career ==
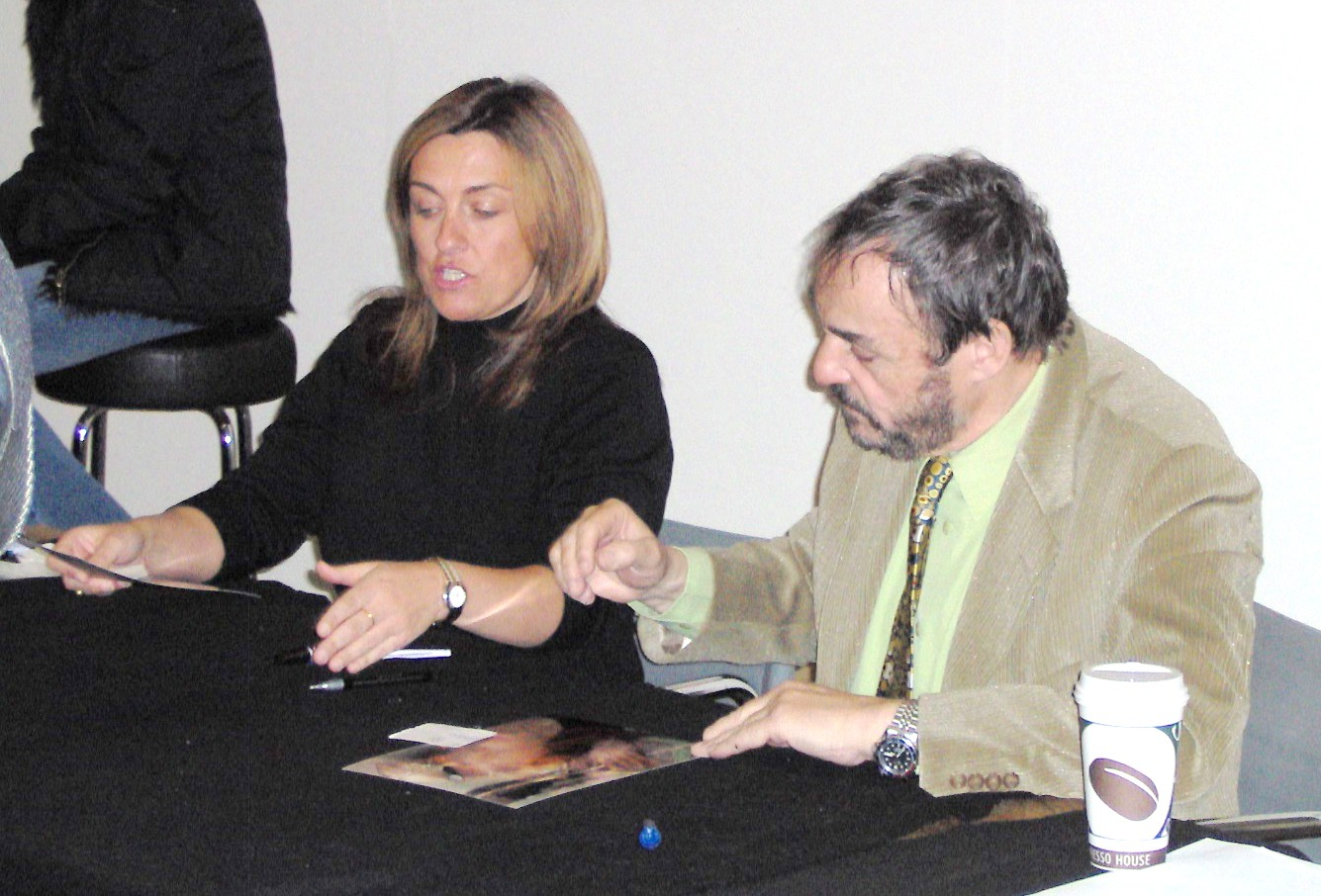
Rhys-Davies (right) at SciFiWorld Malmö, Sweden in May 2005

Rhys-Davies appeared sporadically on UK television in the early 1970s, including his role as the gangster "Laughing Spam Fritter" opposite Adam Faith in Budgie and as Grigory Zinoviev in Fall of Eagles. Later, Rhys-Davies played Praetorian officer Naevius Sutorius Macro in I, Claudius. He then began to appear more frequently, and not just in the UK, with roles as a Portuguese navigator Rodrigues in the 1980 television miniseries Shōgun, based on the novel by James Clavell.

In 1989, Rhys-Davies played Marvel Comics character Kingpin in The Trial of the Incredible Hulk. He also starred in another Clavell adaption, Noble House, set in Hong Kong, where Rhys-Davies plays Ian Dunross' corporate enemy, Quillan Gornt. He has since appeared in numerous television shows and miniseries, including Agent Michael Malone in the 1993 remake of the 1950s television series The Untouchables as well as a leading role in the television series Sliders as Professor Maximillian Arturo from 1995 to 1997.

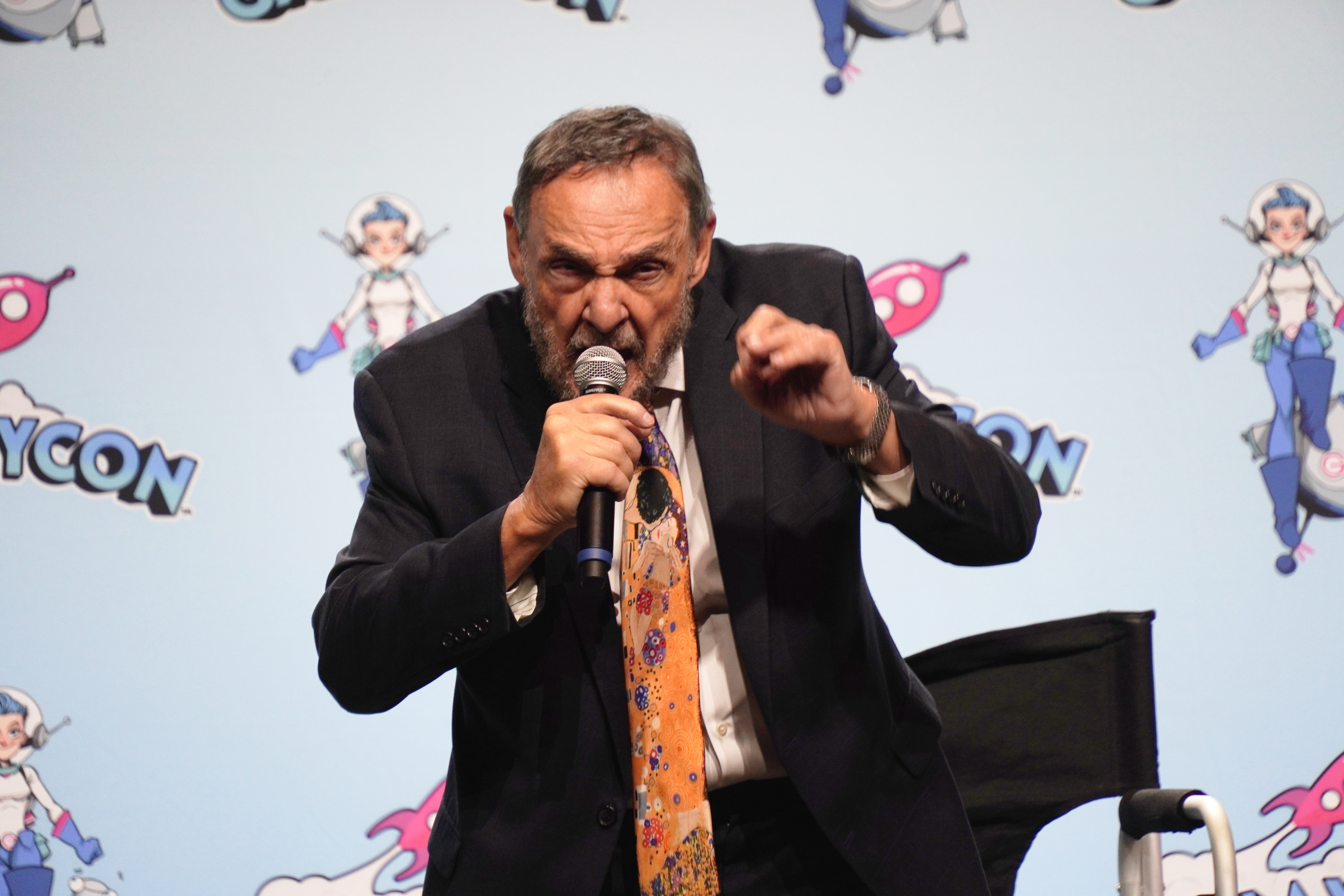
Rhys-Davies at Galaxy Con Richmond in 2023

Rhys-Davies also appeared in Reilly, Ace of Spies in 1983, made several appearances in Star Trek: Voyager as a holodeck version of Leonardo da Vinci, starred as an ally of James Bond in The Living Daylights, and appeared in the film One Night with the King. Rhys-Davies has played the character Porthos in two separate projects; a two-part episode of The Secret Adventures of Jules Verne, and the Hallmark Channel film La Femme Musketeer. He appears in the full-motion video cut scenes of computer games including Ripper (as Vigo Haman) (1996), Dune 2000 (as Noree Moneo) (1998), and the Wing Commander series (as James Taggart, doubling as the voice of Thrakhath nar Kiranka in the third game of the series).

In 2004, Rhys-Davies narrated The Privileged Planet, a documentary that makes the case for intelligent design. He also provided narration in the MTV series Wildboyz around this time. In 2013, Rhys-Davies appeared in the family history programme Coming Home, in which he discovered information about his grandfather's life in the Carmarthenshire coal mines.

In 2014, Rhys-Davies joined the cast of the television show Métal Hurlant Chronicles to play Holgarth, an immortal alchemist. In October 2015, it was announced that he had a role in the single-player module Squadron 42, of the planned PC game franchise Star Citizen; the work consisted of full body motion capture, including facial expressions and his voice. In October 2024, with Squadron 42 in its 10th year of development, the developer suggested that it might be released in 2026.

=== Indiana Jones movies ===
Rhys-Davies played Sallah in the 1981 film Raiders of the Lost Ark. He reprised the role of Sallah in two subsequent Indiana Jones films.

=== The Lord of the Rings movies ===
Rhys-Davies appeared as the dwarf Gimli in The Lord of the Rings trilogy. The cinematography of the films was aided in that Rhys-Davies is tall – 6 ft 1 in (1.85 m), compared to the actors playing hobbits at around 5 ft 6 in (1.68 m). Therefore, although his character was supposed to be short, Rhys-Davies was properly in proportion compared to the hobbit actors. Had he been of more similar height, shots of the entire fellowship would have required three camera passes rather than two.

Rhys-Davies is the only one of the nine Fellowship of the Ring actors who did not receive a tattoo of the word "nine" written in the Tengwar script; his stunt double, Brett Beattie, was offered the tattoo instead as Rhys-Davies was disinclined to get one himself and Beattie had spent so much time as his double that he almost received co-credit.

Rhys-Davies suffered severe reactions to the prosthetics used during filming, and his eyes sometimes swelled shut. When asked whether Rhys-Davies would consider returning to the role for the film version of The Hobbit, he said, "I have already completely ruled it out. There's a sentimental part of me that would love to be involved again. Really I am not sure my face can take that sort of punishment any more." Rhys-Davies added that this time around, "[t]hey've got a different set of problems ... because you've got 13 dwarves, a whole band of them ... You're trying to represent a whole race ... You're trying to do for dwarves what The Lord of the Rings did for hobbits." He offered help as a dwarf advisor in 2011, but ruled out returning as Gimli in The Hobbit because of the punishing makeup required.

=== Voice work ===
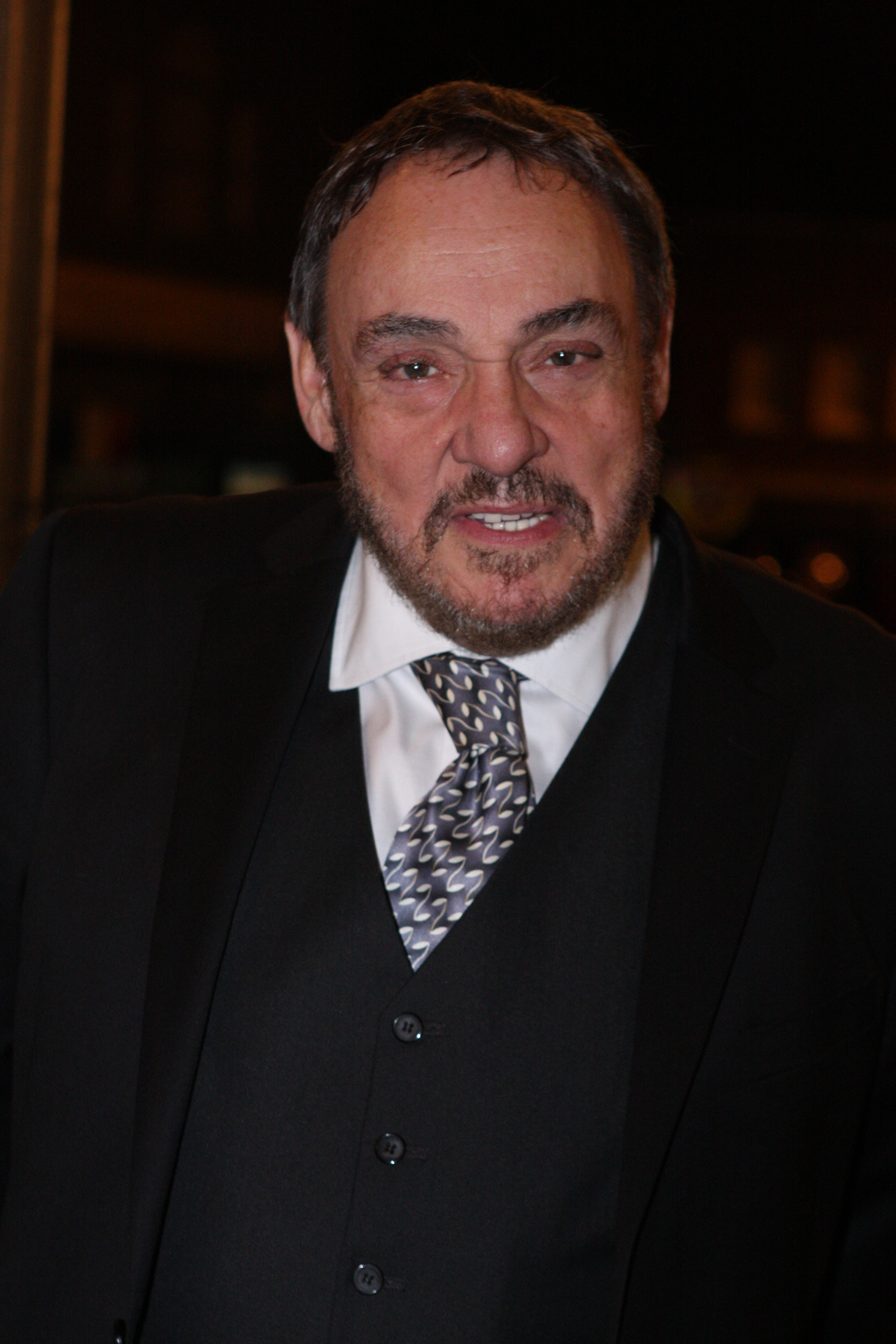
Rhys-Davies in 2012

In addition to voicing the Ent Treebeard in Lord of the Rings, Rhys-Davies has lent his distinctive voice to many video games and animated television series, including the role of Hades in Justice League, the original voice of Man Ray in SpongeBob SquarePants (until both roles were recast with Bob Joles), and numerous times in Gargoyles (1994–1996), as the character Macbeth. He also lent his vocal talents to the games Freelancer (as Richard Winston Tobias) and Lords of Everquest (both in 2003) and the game Quest for Glory IV: Shadows of Darkness, which was released with his narration on a CD-ROM version in 1995. Rhys-Davies also had a voice role on Baldur's Gate: Dark Alliance as the character Jherek, and narrated a documentary called The Glory of Macedonia. Next Generation magazine gave its Dune 2000 review "an automatic one-star deduction for featuring John "Multimedia Whore" Rhys-Davies in the FMV."

Rhys-Davies' voice can be heard on the 2009 documentary Reclaiming the Blade. In the narration, he explores swords, historical European swordsmanship and fight choreography on film, a topic very familiar to Rhys-Davies from his experiences in The Lord of the Rings trilogy, where his character wielded an axe in many scenes.

In 2004, Rhys-Davies was the unknowing subject of an internet prank that spread false rumours in several mainstream media sources that he was scheduled to play the role of General Grievous in Star Wars Episode III.

Rhys-Davies is the narrator of The Truth & Life Dramatized audio New Testament Bible, a 22-hour, celebrity-voiced, fully dramatised audiobook version of the New Testament which uses the Revised Standard Version-Catholic Edition translation. In 2011, he presented KJB: The Book That Changed The World, which features Rhys-Davies reading diverse snippets from the King James Version.

Rhys-Davies' voice work also includes voice-over work with Breathe Bible. In 2016, he provided spoken words for Voices of Fire, the sixth album by a cappella power metal band van Canto.

A resident of the Isle of Man since 1988, John Rhys-Davies provides the introductory voice-over to the Island's Castle Rushen, one of the best-preserved medieval fortresses in the British Isles. In 2018, he lent his voice to the Isle of Man's tourism commercial.

Rhys-Davies voice was recorded for some of the callouts in the 1993 Williams SuperPin Indiana Jones: The Pinball Adventure.

In the 2023 video game The Lord of the Rings: Return to Moria, Rhys-Davies reprises the role of Gimli and narrates the opening scene.

== Personal life ==
=== Relationships ===
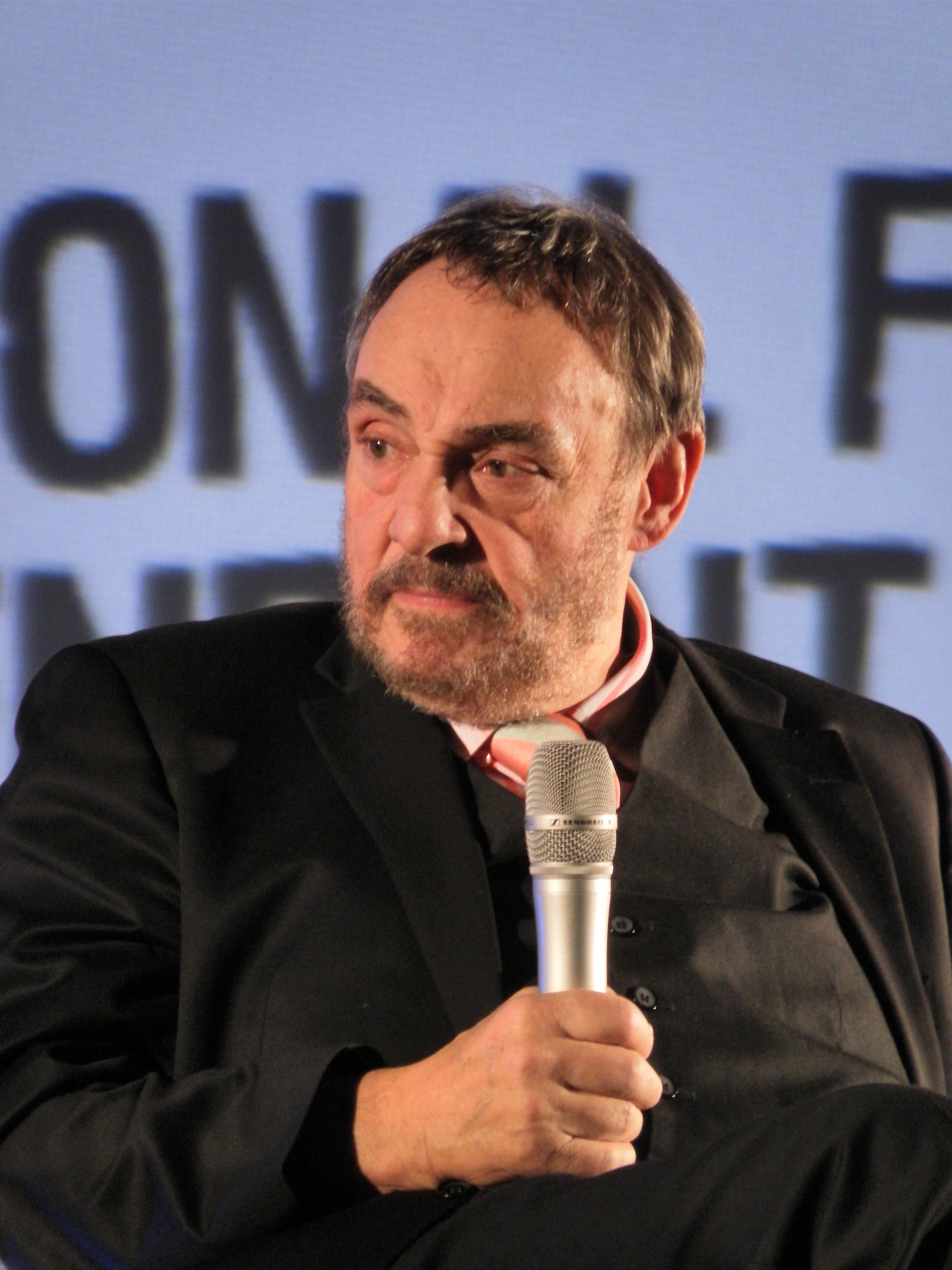
Rhys-Davies in April 2013

Rhys-Davies married Suzanne Wilkinson in December 1966, and they had two sons together. Although they legally separated in 1985, they remained married until her death from Alzheimer's disease in 2010. They remained friends, and Rhys-Davies took care of Wilkinson in her final years.

In 2004, Rhys-Davies began dating Lisa Manning. They have a daughter together, and split their time between homes in the New Zealand region of Waikato and the village of Kirk Michael on the Isle of Man.

=== Religious views ===
While Rhys-Davies identifies as irreligious, he holds Christianity in high regard and has stated that "Christian civilisation has made the world a better place than it ever was."

In February 2020, Rhys-Davies stated, "All the things that we value, the right of free speech, the right of the individual conscience, these evolved in first and second century Roman Christendom, where the individual Christian said, 'I have a right to believe, what I believe and not what the Emperor tells me.' From that our whole idea of democracy and the equality that we have has developed. We owe Christianity the greatest debt of thanks that a generation can ever have, and to slight it and to dismiss it as being irrelevant is the detritus of rather ill-read minds, I think."

=== Political views ===
Rhys-Davies is not a member of any political party. He was a radical leftist as a university student in the 1960s, but changed his views after heckling Margaret Thatcher, who he said "shot down the first two hecklers in such brilliant fashion that [he] decided [he] ought for once to shut up and listen".

In 2004, Rhys-Davies said in an interview with World magazine: "There is a demographic catastrophe happening in Europe that nobody wants to talk about, that we daren't bring up because we are so cagey about not offending people racially. And rightly we should be. But there is a cultural thing as well. By 2020, 50% of the children in Holland under the age of 18 will be of Muslim descent." In an interview with the conservative journal National Review, he said that he is opposed to Islamic extremism because he believes that it violates the Western values of equality, democracy, tolerance, and the abolition of slavery.

Rhys-Davies was vocal in his support for Brexit.

== Filmography ==
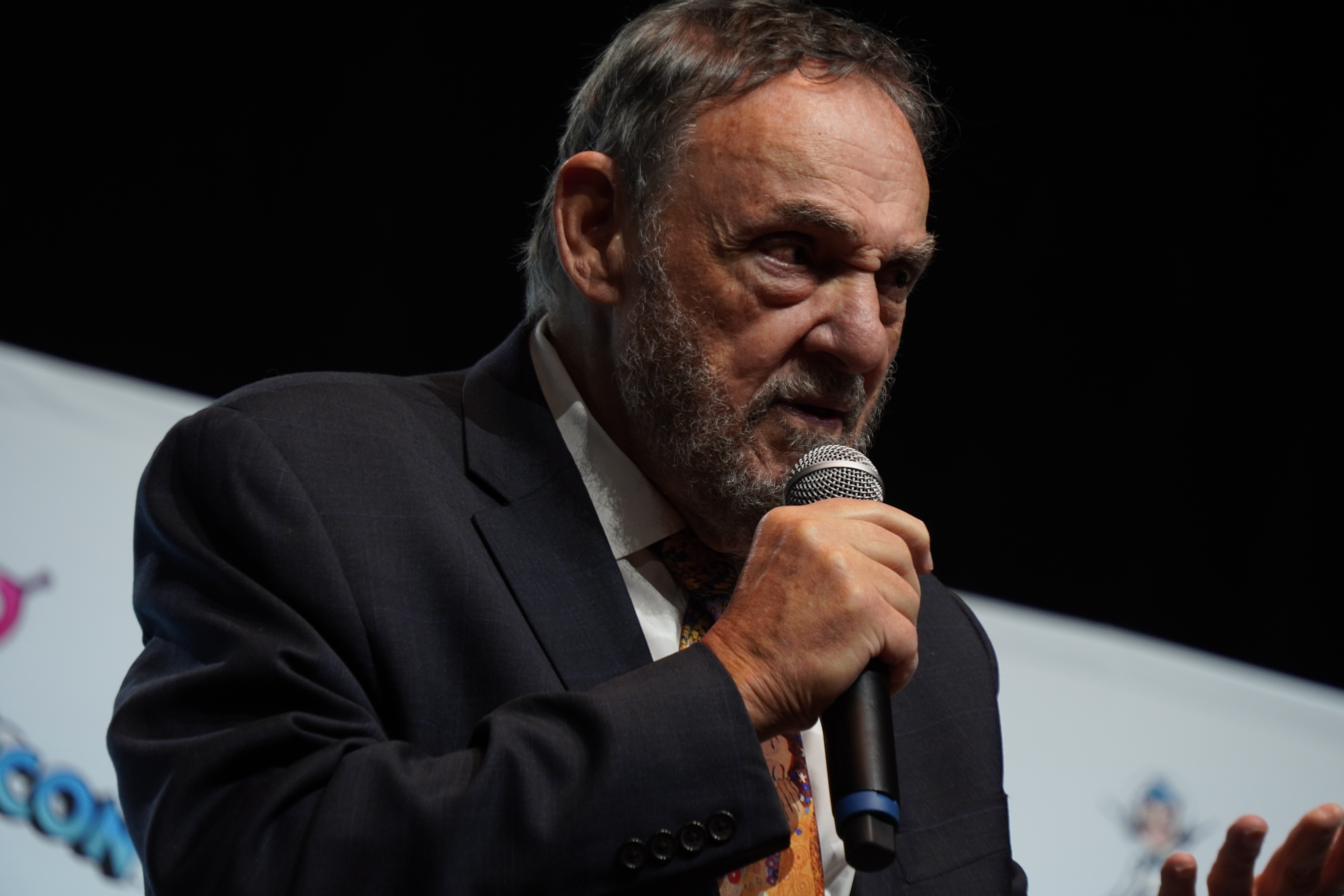
Rhys-Davies at Galaxy Con Richmond in 2023

=== Film ===
Year	Film	Role	Notes
1973	Penny Gold	Rugby Player	
1974	The Black Windmill	Fake Military Policeman	Uncredited
1979	A Nightingale Sang in Berkeley Square	Solicitor	
1981	Raiders of the Lost Ark	Sallah	
1982	Best Revenge	Mustapha	
1982	Victor/Victoria	Andre Cassell	
1982	The Island of Adventure	Smith	
1983	Sahara	Rasoul	
1984	Sword of the Valiant	Baron Fortinbras	
1985	King Solomon's Mines	Dogati	
1986	Firewalker	"Corky" Taylor	
1987	The Living Daylights	General Leonid Pushkin	
1988	Waxwork	Werewolf	
1988	Young Toscanini	Claudio Rossi	
1989	Indiana Jones and the Last Crusade	Sallah	
1989	Rising Storm	Donwaldo	
1992	The Lost World	Professor Challenger	
1992	Return to the Lost World	Professor Challenger	
1992	The Unnamable II: The Statement of Randolph Carter	Professor Warren	
1993	The Double 0 Kid	Rudolph "Rudi" von Keseenbaum	Direct-to-video
1993	Sunset Grill	Stockton	
1993	Cyborg Cop	Kessel	Direct-to-video
1993	The Seventh Coin	Captain Galil	
1994	The High Crusade	Brother Parvus	
1994	Robot in the Family	Eli Taki / Rashmud / Sashri	
1995	Glory Daze	Luther	
1996	The Great White Hype	Johnny Windsor	
1996	Aladdin and the King of Thieves	Cassim	Voice; direct-to-video
1997	Cats Don't Dance	Woolie the Mammoth	Voice
1997	Bloodsport III	Jacques Duvalier	Direct-to-video
1997	The Protector	Rasheed	
1998	Secret of the Andes	Father Claver	
2000	Sinbad: Beyond the Veil of Mists	King Akron / Baraka	Voice
2000	Delta Force One: The Lost Patrol	Ivan	
2001	Never Say Never Mind: The Swedish Bikini Team	Hakim	
2001	The Lord of the Rings: The Fellowship of the Ring	Gimli / Gloin	
2002	Scorcher	Dr. Matthew Sallin	
2002	The Lord of the Rings: The Two Towers	Gimli / Treebeard (voice)	
2003	Coronado	President Hugo Luis Ramos	
2003	Endangered Species	Lieutenant Wyznowski	
2003	The Jungle Book 2	Village Leader	Voice
2003	The Medallion	Commander Hammerstock-Smythe	
2003	The Lord of the Rings: The Return of the King	Gimli / Treebeard (voice)	
2004	The Princess Diaries 2: Royal Engagement	Viscount Mabrey	
2004	The Lost Angel	Father Kevin	
2004	The Privileged Planet	The Narrator	Voice; documentary
2005	The Game of Their Lives	Bill Jeffrey	
2005	The King Maker	Phillippe	
2006	Shark Bait	Thorton	Voice; English dub
2006	One Night with the King	Mordecai	
2006	The Legend of Sasquatch	Ranger Steve	Voice
2007	In the Name of the King	Merick	
2007	The Ferryman	The Greek	
2007	Catching Kringle	Santa Claus	Voice
2009	Reclaiming the Blade	The Narrator	Voice; documentary
2009	31 North 62 East	John Hammond	
2010	Tom and Jerry Meet Sherlock Holmes	Dr. Watson	Voice; direct-to-video
2011	KJB: The Book That Changed the World	Himself / Presenter	Direct-to-video
2011	Sophie and Sheba	Alistair Winston	
2011	Treasure Hunters	Nathan Pickett	
2012	Escape	Malcolm Andrews	Direct-to-video
2013	Return to the Hiding Place	Eusi	
2013	100 Degrees Below Zero	Ralph Dillard	Direct-to-video
2013	Scooby-Doo! Adventures: The Mystery Map	Pirate Gnarlybeard	Voice; direct-to-video
2013	Prisoners of the Sun	Professor Hayden Masterton	
2014	Apocalypse Pompeii	Colonel Carlo Dillard	Direct-to-video
2014	Saul: The Journey to Damascus	Caiphas	Direct-to-video
2014	The Prophet	Yousef	Voice
2014	Time Lapse	Mr. Bezzerides	
2015	Beyond the Mask	Charles Kemp	
2016	The Apostle Peter: Redemption	Saint Peter	
2017	Camera Store	"Pinky" Steuben	
2018	Shemira	Myer	
2018	Aquaman	Brine King	Voice
2019	The Pilgrim's Progress	Evangelist	Voice
2019	Valley of the Gods	Dr. Herrmann	
2019	Santa Fake	Joe O'Brian	
2019	Mosley	Warnie	Voice
2020	Grizzly II: Revenge	Karl Bouchard	Filmed in 1983
2020	Tainted	Vladimir	
2020	Shadowtown	Einar	
2020	I Am Patrick: The Patron Saint of Ireland	Old Patrick	Documentary
2020	G-Loc	Henry	
2020	Moments in Spacetime	Mason	
2020	Silent Night: A Song for the World	General Haig	
2021	Prick'd	Archie	
2022	Kingslayer	William Marshal	
2022	The Gates	Frederick Ladbroke	
2023	Indiana Jones and the Dial of Destiny	Sallah	
2023	Aquaman and the Lost Kingdom	Brine King	Voice
2023	Little Brown Bird	Dad	Short film
2026	Starbright	Raphael	
TBA	The Way of the Wind	Uriah	Post-production

=== Television ===
Year	Title	Role	Notes
1974	Zodiac	Aikman	Episode: "Death of a Crab"
1974	Fall of Eagles	Grigory Zinoviev	Episode: "The Secret War"
1975	The Sweeney	Ron Brett	Episode: "Poppy"
1975	The Naked Civil Servant	Barndoor	Television film
1976	I, Claudius	Naevius Sutorius Macro	2 episodes
1976	Warship	CPO Cook Mantell	Episode: "Heart of Oak"
1977	1990	Ivor Griffith	Episode: "Health Farm"
1977	Just William	Authority	Episode: "William and the Wonderful Present"
1978	Z-Cars	Terry Larkin	Episode: "Fat Freddie B.A."
1978	The Nativity	Nestor	Television film
1979	The Danedyke Mystery	Ronnie "Armchair" Newbound	6 episodes
1979–1980	BBC Television Shakespeare	Eustace Chapuys / Salerio	2 episodes
1980	Shōgun	Vasco Rodrigues	Miniseries
1981	Peter and Paul	Silas	Miniseries
1982	CHiPs	Nakura	Episode: "Force Seven"
1982	Ivanhoe	Front-de-Boeuf	Television film
1982	The Quest	Sir Edward	9 episodes (4 unaired)
1983	Reilly, Ace of Spies	Tanyatos	Episode: "An Affair with a Married Woman"
1983	Sadat	Gamal Abdel Nasser	Miniseries
1984	Robin of Sherwood	King Richard	Episode: "The King's Fool"
1984	Scarecrow and Mrs. King	Lord Bromfield	Episode: "Affair at Bromfield Hall"
1984	Kim	Babu	Television film
1987	Marjorie and the Preacher Man	Seymour	Television drama
1987	The Little Match Girl	Police Chief Murphy	Television film
1987, 1992	Perry Mason	Edward Tremayne / Phillip Graff	2 episodes
1988	Noble House	Quillan Gornt	Miniseries
1988	War and Remembrance	Sammy Mutterperl	Miniseries
1988	Goddess of Love	Zeus	Television film
1988–1994	Murder, She Wrote	Harry Mordecai / Harry Waverly / Lancaster	3 episodes
1989	The Trial of the Incredible Hulk	Wilson Fisk / Kingpin	Television film
1989	The Gifted One	Carl Boardman	Television film
1989	Great Expectations	Joe Gargery	Miniseries
1991	The Mysteries of the Dark Jungle	O'Connor	Miniseries
1991	Tales from the Crypt	Duval	Episode: "Dead Wait"
1991	The Strauss Dynasty	Gribov	Miniseries
1992	Batman: The Animated Series	Waclaw Jozek / Baron	Voice, episode: "The Cape and Cowl Conspiracy"
1992	Archaeology: Voyages of the Vikings	The Narrator	Voice; documentary series
1992	Ring of the Musketeers	Maurice Treville	Television film
1992	The Making of Aladdin: A Whole New World	Host	Documentary
1992–1993	The Legend of Prince Valiant	King Hugo / King Donovan	Voice; 8 episodes
1993	Animaniacs	Tympannini	Voice; episode: "Piano Rag"
1993–1994	The Untouchables	Agent Michael Malone	15 episodes
1994	Blood of the Innocent	Captain Shmuda	Television film
1994	A Flintstones Christmas Carol	Charles Brickens	Voice; television special
1995	Fantastic Four	Thor	Voice; 2 episodes
1995	Archaeology: Florida's Lost Empire	Host	Documentary series
1995–1996	Gargoyles	Macbeth / Arthur Morwood-Smythe / Findleach	Voice; 13 episodes
1995–1997	Sliders	Professor Maximillian Arturo	40 episodes
1996	The Incredible Hulk	Thor	Voice; episode: "Mortal Bounds"
1996	Boo to You Too! Winnie the Pooh	The Narrator	Voice; television special
1996	Marquis de Sade	Inspector Marais	Television film
1996	Mortal Kombat: Defenders of the Realm	Asgarth	Episode: "Overthrown"
1997	Freakazoid!	Professor Beasthead	Voice; episode: "Tomb of Invisibo"
1997	You Wish	"Madman" Mustapha	3 episodes
1997	Star Trek: Voyager	Leonardo da Vinci	2 episodes
1999	Au Pair	Nigel Kent	Television film
2000	Britannic	Captain Charles Bartlett	Television film
2001–2002	SpongeBob SquarePants	Man Ray	Voice
2002	Justice League	Hades	Voice; episode: "Paradise Lost"
2002	The Zeta Project	Edgar Mandragora	Voice; episode: "Ro's Gift"
2002	Sabretooth	Anthony Bricklin	Television film
2002	Fillmore!	Lenny	Voice; episode: "Ingrid Third, Public Enemy #1"
2003	Helen of Troy	King Priam	Miniseries
2004	Dragon Storm	King Fastrad	Television film
2004	12 Days of Terror	Captain	Television film
2004	La Femme Musketeer	Porthos	Television film
2005	Revelations	Professor Jonah Lampley	Miniseries
2005	Chupacabra: Dark Seas	Captain Randolph	Television film
2006	Super Robot Monkey Team Hyperforce Go!	Captain Proteus	Voice; episode: "Demon of the Deep"
2008	Anaconda 3: Offspring	Murdoch	Television film
2008	Fire and Ice: The Dragon Chronicles	Sangimel	Television film
2008	Kiss Me Deadly	Yale Ericson	Television film
2009	Dark Days in Monkey City	The Narrator	Voice; 4 episodes
2009	Anacondas: Trail of Blood	Murdoch	Television film
2009	Kröd Mändoon and the Flaming Sword of Fire	Grimshank	3 episodes
2010	Legend of the Seeker	Horace	Episode: "Vengeance"
2010	Three Wise Women	Archangel Green	Television film
2010	Medium Raw: Night of the Wolf	Elliot Carbon	Television film
2011	Ferocious Planet	Senator Jackson Crenshaw	Television film
2012	Psych	Museum Curator	Episode: "Indiana Shawn and the Temple of the Kinda Crappy, Rusty Old Dagger"
2012	Missing Christmas	The Narrator / Santa Claus	Voice; television special
2014	Let The Season In	The Narrator	Tabernacle Choir Christmas concert special (filmed in 2013)
2014	Once Upon a Time	Grand Pabbie	Voice; 3 episodes
2015	Killing Jesus	Annas	Television film
2015	The Adventures of Puss in Boots	Goodsword	Voice; episode: "Sword"
2015–2016	TripTank	Various characters	Voice; 7 episodes
2016	The Shannara Chronicles	Eventine Elessedil	7 episodes
2016	Winter Thaw	Martin Avdeitch	Television film
2016	The Lion Guard	King Sokwe	Voice; episode: "The Lost Gorillas"
2018	A Dickens Christmas	The Narrator	Tabernacle Choir Christmas concert special
2019	Fresh Eggs	Cutter Anderson	6 episodes
2020	Wizards: Tales of Arcadia	Galahad	Voice; 7 episodes
2022	Documentary Now!	Garth Davies-Gruffudd	Episode: "How They Threw Rocks"

=== Video games ===
Year	Title	Role	Notes
1994	Quest for Glory: Shadows of Darkness	Narrator	Voice actor
1994	Wing Commander III: Heart of the Tiger	James Taggart / Prince Thrakhath	Actor
1996	Wing Commander IV: The Price of Freedom	James Taggart	Actor
1996	Ripper	Vigo Haman	Actor
1998	Dune 2000	Noree Moneo	Actor
2001	Baldur's Gate: Dark Alliance	Jherek	Voice actor
2002	The Lord of the Rings: The Two Towers	Treebeard	Voice actor
2003	The Lord of the Rings: The Return of the King	Gimli / Treebeard	Voice actor
2003	Freelancer	Richard Winston Tobias	Voice actor
2004	The Lord of the Rings: The Battle for Middle-earth	Gimli / Treebeard	Archive audio
2006	The Lord of the Rings: The Battle for Middle-earth II	Gimli / Treebeard	Archive audio
2009	Risen	Don Esteban	Voice actor
2012	Lego The Lord of the Rings	Gimli	Archive audio
2015	Lego Dimensions	Gimli	Archive audio
2023	The Lord of the Rings: Return to Moria	Gimli	Voice actor
2027	Squadron 42	Randall Graves	Motion capture in 2015 and 2023

== Audio work ==
Audiobooks

- Indiana Jones and the Last Crusade (1989 Buena Vista Records)
- Rescued (2006)
- Affabel: Window of Eternity (2007 John Bevere, 2009 Bethany House)
- Sir Malcolm and the Missing Prince (2009)
- The Extraordinary Adventures of G. A. Henty: In the Reign of Terror (2016)
- The Trials of Saint Patrick (2017)

Podcasts

- Batman Unburied (2022, as Hugo Strange)
- Inside of You with Michael Rosenbaum (2024, as guest star)

== Awards and nominations ==
Year	Association	Category	Project	Result
1980	Primetime Emmy Award	Outstanding Supporting Actor in a Miniseries or Movie	Shōgun	Nominated
2001	Screen Actors Guild Award	Outstanding Cast in a Motion Picture	The Lord of the Rings: The Fellowship of the Ring	Nominated
2001	Phoenix Film Critics Society Award	Best Cast	The Lord of the Rings: The Fellowship of the Ring	Won
2002	Screen Actors Guild Award	Outstanding by a Cast in a Motion Picture	The Lord of the Rings: The Two Towers	Nominated
2002	Phoenix Film Critics Society Award	Best Cast	The Lord of the Rings: The Two Towers	Won
2003	Broadcast Film Critics Association	Best Cast	The Lord of the Rings: The Return of the King	Won
2003	National Board of Review	Best Cast	The Lord of the Rings: The Return of the King	Won
2003	Screen Actors Guild Award	Outstanding Cast in a Motion Picture	The Lord of the Rings: The Return of the King	Won
2003	Phoenix Film Critics Society Award	Best Cast	The Lord of the Rings: The Return of the King	Nominated
