= Association for Renaissance Martial Arts =

- Abbreviation: ARMA
- Predecessor: Historical Armed Combat Association (HACA)
- Formation: 2001
- Founder: John Clements
- Type: Nonprofit organization
- Purpose: Historical European martial arts
- Headquarters: United States
- Director: John Clements
- Website: www.thearma.org

Association for Renaissance Martial Arts (ARMA) is a US-based non-profit organization dedicated to the study and practice of historical European martial arts of the 15th to 17th centuries.

ARMA was formed in 2001 under director John Clements as a continuation of the Historical Armed Combat Association (HACA, since 1992). As of 2006, the ARMA reported around 500 paying members. They also list a number of "Academic Consultants".

== History ==
The ARMA began in 1992 as the Historical Armed Combat Association (HACA), a group led principally by Hank Reinhardt, an avid sword enthusiast. Reinhardt's objective was to provide an umbrella organization for individuals interested in Western swords and historical weaponry. After Clements took over the organization in 1993, HACA went under a series of reforms. HACA began to focus primarily on the study and interpretation of the historical source literature of Renaissance Martial Arts.

In 2001, HACA expanded to include updated educational organization for the study and practice of Medieval and Renaissance fencing. A supposedly more efficient study curriculum for practice had also been developed at this time using the source literature. As one of the changes, the organization was renamed "the ARMA." 2001 also saw the introduction of a "national training program" (a series of seminars and workshops), ranking and certifications in the curricula, and the implementation of the basic philosophy and methodology used by the ARMA today.

The ARMA's conceptualization was also influenced by the work of Sydney Anglo, as presented in his work, The Martial Arts of Renaissance Europe (Yale University Press 2000), which is hailed as the first academic treatment of Western martial arts to be written in English.

During the ARMA International Event in August, 2009, ARMA Director John Clements introduced to the ARMA membership a new curriculum for the Martial Arts of Renaissance Europe (MARE), referred to within ARMA as the "Rosetta Stone". Clements intended this new curriculum to be based on "how the historical masters were teaching the art".

In September 2010 the ARMA became an official representative for the Martial Arts of Renaissance Europe (MARE) to the World Martial Arts Union (WoMAU).

== Curriculum ==
The ARMA aims at a reconstruction of historical techniques, avoiding "borrowings" from living traditions of martial arts or classical fencing.

Wooden wasters and steel feather swords (Federschwert) are used for basic drilling and technique work.. Padded contact-weapons, along with helmets and appropriate padding, were previously used for more intense free-play, including sparring at full speed and power, though these have fallen out of favor. Sharp replica swords are used only for testcutting and to teach students proper edge control and cutting technique.

The ARMA curriculum encompasses a variety of weapons and weapon combinations, armored and unarmored, including longsword, greatsword, single sword (cut & thrust), sword & buckler, sword & dagger, Messer, rapier, rapier & dagger, single dagger, polearm, and short staff. Kampfringen, a historical system of unarmed combat, is also taught, both as it relates to fighting with weapons and as a separate discipline.

== Organization ==
=== Associate Members and Study Groups ===
Upon joining the ARMA, new members receive learning material. Lone members are Associates and three or four members who work together locally may apply to form official Study Groups. Non-members are allowed limited practice with members and Study Groups but are encouraged to join the organization.

In addition, regional Study Days, member Workshop events, and National Training Program Seminars are frequently held, and members in a given area may have the opportunity to attend at least one annually. Senior students and expert instructors are invited to present classes, lectures, and seminars to attendees. ARMA members are given priority in these events, and non-members may be prohibited from participating in certain Workshops. However, one- and two-day "open workshops" are offered in which non-member may attend.

Outside the USA, there are Study Groups in Poland, Mexico, and Greece.

=== National Training Program ===
The National Training Program acts as the core instructive curriculum of ARMA, offering basic fundamental knowledge to participants so that they may study and progress on their own. The program content is a composite approach derived from the teachings of a variety of historical masters, and specifically designed for students and practitioners over extended distances who are without the benefit of competent instruction or practice partners.

The National Training Program provides training in six main areas, each featuring some subsets. These are the Longsword, the Sword and Dagger, the Rapier, unarmed fighting, dagger fighting, and armored fighting. However, the ARMA currently focuses on the Longsword, Sword and Dagger, and the Rapier as foundational instructional principles.

=== Uniform and Rankings ===
The uniform worn by members of the ARMA consists of a red T-shirt and black sweatpants. Non-members who practice with ARMA study groups are encouraged to wear a white T-shirt and black sweatpants. ARMA members of Provost rank wear instead a black T-shirt with red pants. (Senior students may also assume this uniform when offering instruction at official seminars.) There is also a recognized but optional ARMA formal "dress uniform," which consists of period-style clothing in the same color scheme.

ARMA ranking is somewhat informal and is based on the four-tiered system employed by the London Company of Masters, "Scholar", "Free Scholar", "Provost" and "Master".

All ARMA members are considered to possess the rank of "Scholar". Scholars who achieve sufficient command of the Armatura and basic principles of the ARMA program, and a matching knowledge of the fighting manuals and historical masters, are advanced to the rank of "Scholar Adept". Scholar Adepts who demonstrate considerable expertise in all areas of the ARMA training program and an advanced knowledge of the source material are considered for "Free Scholar" rank. Testing for either rank involves an extensive oral examination and the physical demonstration of technique, as determined by the instructors conducting the test. Qualifying for Free Scholar rank also requires a Prize Playing. Free Scholar testing may be administered by any Free Scholar. Free Scholar certification requires the oversight of two or more Free Scholars or the Director; by custom, as many Free Scholars as can be gathered are present to oversee such a test.

Unlike rankings in most martial arts organizations, Free Scholar rankings must be renewed; if a scholar has not advanced to a higher rank within four years of playing his prize, he must be retested in order to retain his current status. Free Scholar rankings are earned in a specific weapon, and a candidate must achieve a rank with the longsword before testing for any other weapon.

Above Free Scholar are the ranks of Provost, Senior Provost, and Master. The ARMA considers it highly inappropriate at this juncture to consider naming any ARMA practitioner a "Master" of these extinct arts, as the ARMA believes that the restoration of Medieval and Renaissance martial arts is still in its infancy and no modern practitioner has contributed to the art enough to claim the title of "Master".

Outside of this system, there is a purely academic distinction called "Senior Researcher" that is granted to ARMA scholars who contribute significantly to the general body of knowledge on historical fencing. The ARMA also has over a dozen "Expert Consultants" from different fields who have offered their knowledge and expertise to its efforts.

== See also ==
- Swordsmanship
