= Company of Masters =

The Company of Maisters of the Science of Defence was an organisation formed in England during the reign of Henry VIII to regulate the teaching of the Science of Defence or fencing, using a range of weapons, including the rapier, quarterstaff, and, most notably, the broadsword. The jurisdiction of the organisation is unknown as few records have survived. There is evidence that it was a London-based Society of fencing masters, with proof of the commission extending to the South West of England.

This school of fencing persisted throughout the 16th century but declined after the end of the Tudor period.

== Founded in Tudor England ==
Henry VIII sanctioned the organisation to protect its masters from laws that prohibited the public practice of martial arts. The Liber Albus (Book III, 1180) was the first legal record to ban fencing schools within the City of London, which was extended later by Edward I (1285). The sanction was made as Letters Patent, still preserved in the Public Records Office (C.82/770), Calendar of Letters and Papers of Henry VIII, Vol. XV, No. 95 (Aylward, pp.256):

Ric. Beste, Humphry Bassett, Rob. Polwarth, John Legge, Peter Beste, Philip Williams, Ric. Lord, John Vincent, Nic. de la Haye, Masters of the Science of Defence, and Will Hunt, John Frye, Hen. Whytehead, Gilbert Bekett, Edw. Pynner, Thos. Tourner, Jeffrey Gryffyn, Thos. Hudson, Thos. Tymsey, Hen. Thyklyppes, and John ap. Ryce, provosts of the said science. Commission to enquire and search in all parts of England, Wales, and Ireland for persons being Scholars of ye said Science of Defence, many of whom, regardless of their oathes made to their Masters on first entering to learn the said Science, upon the cross of a sword in remembrance of the Cross whereon Our Lord suffered, have for their own lucre of their unsociable covetous minds, without sufficient licence, resorted to all parts of England, keeping open schools and taking great sums for their labours, and yet have insufficiently instructed their scholars to the great slander of the Masters and Provosts of the Science and of the good and laudable Orders and Rules of the same, and to take any Scholar so misusing himself before the nearest justice of the Peace to be bound over in sufficient sureties not to repeat his offences against his said oathe and the said Orders and Rules or in case of refusal, to be committed to gaol. West. 20 July, 32 Henry VIII. Del. West. 20 July S.B. [1540].

This was a formal Warrant of Inquiry or Commission Letter that licensed the named individuals to establish Fencing Schools, but also granted the powers to hold deviant Fencing masters to account. It served to prevent unlicensed instructors from operating, both as a form of quality assurance and as a monopoly to protect the livelihoods of its members. It also elevated the Science of Defence under the powers of the Crown to establish it as the 'Noble Science' - a term that persisted for centuries, and is still associated with Boxing.

It also regulated the conduct of members to one another, both instructor and student. Like the guilds it resembled, the company certified its members with varying ranks, depending on their level of skill and degree of permission to teach. Beginning students took the title Scholar and were required to hold the rank for no less than seven years before progressing to a higher rank following the passing of a test known as Prize Playing. With proper determination and accumulation of skill, an individual moved to the second rank, Free Scholar. This rank marked noted advancement and skill, and like the previous position, had to be held for at least seven years before further progression. The next rank, Provost, provided the individual with apprenticeship to an instructor with whom they worked closely so as to improve their teaching skills and further their martial abilities. The Provost was not by any means a free teacher, remaining under the guidance and financial constraint, in the form of dues, of his superior. A truly gifted individual may have been raised to the title of Maister working as an independent instructor.

The Company of Maisters of the Science of Defence was governed by four senior Maisters, known as the 'Four Ancient Maisters'. Their agreement between them was determined by Indenture Letters, preserved in the Minute Books of the organisation (Sloane MS. 2530).

== Renewal and decline in the Stuart England ==
Evidence of renewal is missing under Edward VI and Elizabeth I.

An additional warrant was discovered in the Exeter City Archives in Devon, issued on the 15th August 1555, under Mary I. This warrant is important because it proves 1) that it was renewed by Mary I, 2) the warrant was issued outside of London, 3) an interim issue by Edward was unlikely because the Marian Warrant quotes the original in full, 4) it shows a return to Chancery law typical of a move away from the Anglican practices.

The Minute Books detail an Elizabethan Warrant, although corroboration of this version has not yet been found in state archives. It extended the remit of the organisation to Inquire across England, Wales and Ireland.

The warrant was renewed under the powers of the Crown by James I, preserved in Rymer's Foedera, Vol. XVI. (6 July 1605). The privilege granted by this Warrant was extinguished automatically on the passing of the Monopolies Act of 21 James I cap III. [1623-24.]: “all Monopolies, Commissions, Grants, Licences, Charters, and Letters Patents void” such that “all persons, bodies politique, and corporations are disabled and incapable of using any Monopolies etc. whatsoever”.

== Primary Sources ==
Evidence about the organisation is limited, but the primary sources are:

1. Minute Books of the Corporation of Masters of the Science of Defence (Sloane MS. 2530). This source includes various Oaths for Provosts and Masters, Indentures between Ancient Masters, Records of Prizes etc.
2. Paradoxes of Defence, and Brief Instructions upon my Paradoxes of Defence by George Silver (1599). Republished by Cyril Matthey (1898). Established many of the principles of the Science, repeated later by Swetnam and Wylde (1714).
3. The Private School of Defence by George Hale (1614). This book attempted to suggest that Fencing could be learned from a book. Izaak Walton's The Complete Angler (1653) observed: "…Mr. Hales, a most valiant and excellent fencer, who in a printed book called A Private Schoole of Defence, undertook to teach that art or science, and was laughed at for his labour. Not that many useful things might be learned from that book, but he was laughed at, because that art was not to be taught by words but by practice."
4. The Schoole of the Noble and Worthy Science of Defence by Joseph Swetnam (1617).

Although Silver, Hale, and Swetnam are known as primary sources, their relationship with the organisation in London is unknown. They are not mentioned in the official Minute Books of the organisation.

== Prizes and events ==
A calendar of some events taken from the period of its establishment:

- 1561 Feb 17: Challenge by Masters of Defence, Whitehall.
- Feb 18: Challenge, second day; a Master fatally injured.
- 1566 Feb 12: Proclamation regulating fencing schools.
- 1567 July 23: Earl of Oxford killed a cook whilst fencing.
- 1571 June 18: Master of Defence came prepared for trial by single combat.
- 1577 Nov 10: friar goes to fencing schools. (Fleetwood).
- 1581 May/June: Whitehall tilt-yard prepared for fencers.
- 1601 end: Jonson's Cynthia's Revels has a parody on Masters of Defence.

== In contemporary literature ==
There are many references to the Masters of Defence from between 1540 and 1625. Here are some examples:

The philosopher and political theorist Thomas Hobbes (1651, Chapter 5) used a reference to Fencing, as he observed that many “…follow the blind blindly, are like him that, trusting to the false rules of a master of fence, ventures presumptuously upon an adversary, that either kills or disgraces him.”

== Modern revival ==
There is no evidence that The Company achieved guild status, and eventually lost influence with the passing of James I's anti-monopoly laws (1624).

There were some attempts in the early 20th century to reform the guild, first in 1903, under the title "The London Académie d’Armes", and again in 1931 as "The British Federation of Fencing Masters".These attempts were interrupted by the Second World War. The modern British Academy of Fencing has claimed to trace its roots back to the company, and was established in 1949.

The modern ‘Company of Maisters’ is a modern Private Limited Company, registered by Terence Peter Brown on the 28 October 1996 (Company No. 03270104, registered in England and Wales). This registration pre-dated the publishing of Terry Brown's book 'English Martial Arts' (1997). This is understood to have been the first formal use of the proper noun 'English Martial Arts' to refer to the martial arts practiced by the original Masters of Defence. The following techniques are outlined in the book English Martial Arts (Brown 1997, 89-220). The skills cover Technical information (89–91), Principles of True Fighting (93–96), Basic Stances (97–99, 201–220). Traces of Terry Brown's legacy in reviving English Martial Arts are found in the work of American Academy of English Martial Arts, English System Principles, Frank Docherty’s English Martial Arts Academy.

Today, several Historical European martial arts (HEMA) groups use modified versions of the Company of Masters ranking system, but not all have associations or affiliations to Terry Brown's revival. These include the Academy of European Medieval Martial Arts (AEMMA), The Stoccata School of Defence, The Company B.S.A, Association for Renaissance Martial Arts (ARMA), True Edge Academy of Swordsmanship, the Noble Science Academy, English Fighting Arts, School of English Martial Arts, the 1595 Club, Academie Glorianna, Academie Duello, the York School of Defense, the New Jersey Historical Fencing Association, the Black Falcon School of Arms and the Manx Academies of Arms, Armour & Defensive Arts, Brighton and Hove's Noble Science of Defence.

== Literature ==
- Aylward, J. D. The English Master of Arms: From the Twelfth to the Twentieth Century. Aylesbury and London: Routledge & Kegan Paul Ltd.
- Berry, Herbert. The Noble Science: A Study and Transcription of Sloane Ms. 2530, Papers of the Maisters of Defence of London, Temp Henry VIII to 1590. London and Toronto: Associated University Presses, 1991. ISBN 0-87413-441-2.
- Brown, Terry. English Martial Arts. Norfolk: Anglo-Saxon Books, 1997.

== See also ==
- Historical fencing in Scotland
