= Star Wars: Evolution of the Lightsaber Duel =

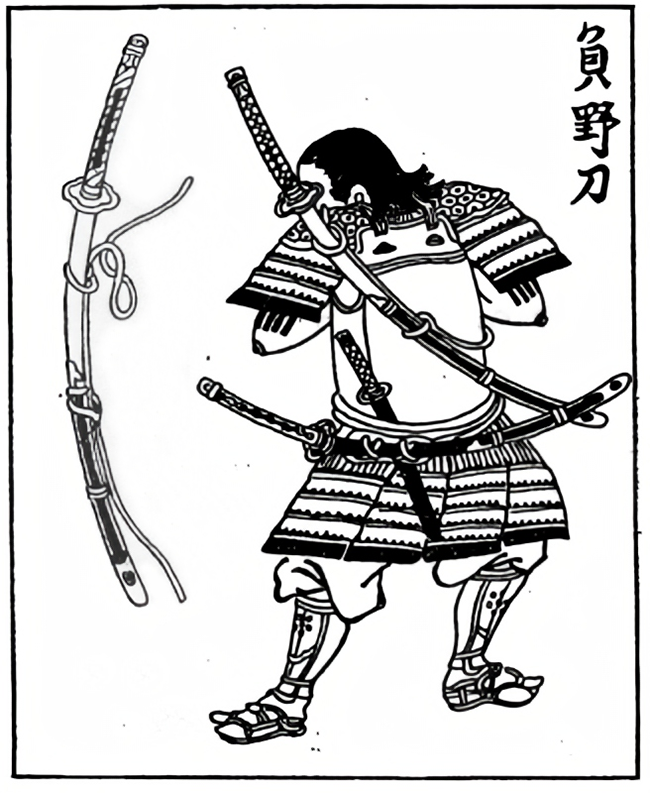
- Samurai wearing a nodachi (field sword) that the concept of the Jedi and the lightsaber parallel themselves upon.
- Directed by: Martin Khodabakhshian
- Original language: English

Production
- Executive producer: Craig T. Lazarus
- Producer: Ben Houser

Original release
- Release: December 15, 2015

Star Wars: Evolution of the Lightsaber Duel is a 2015 documentary hosted by Mark Hamill.

The documentary covers the inspirations and influences that shaped the legendary lightsaber in the Star Wars universe and the duels in which the device is used. In the documentary Hamill describes his time in Japan and his brief exposure to Japanese history and culture and how it influenced the Star Wars franchise.

The Samurai who date back to the medieval history of Japan and their fighting techniques parallel that of the Jedi (and Sith) and their swords handling and usage of the legendary lightsaber. The organizational structure and purpose of the Jedi as spiritual warrior monks also draws from the Samurai who served the same purpose of protecting society and maintaining peace.

According to Hamill in the documentary, the armor of the samurai also resembles and inspired the concept of Darth Vader. The documentary also covers how the lightsaber duel scenes in the films intensified from the Star Wars to Revenge of the Sith.
