= Prize Playing =

Test of martial skill in Renaissance England

A Prize Playing was a test of martial skill popular in Renaissance England with the London-based Corporation of Masters of the Noble Science of Defence as the governing body. It involved several dozen bouts against continually refreshing opponents, with little or no rest in between. The word "prize" refers to the bout itself, not to a reward attained for fighting.

This practice was revived after a fashion in the late 17th century in the form of "Prize Fights", whence the term prizefighting for modern professional boxing.

== Renaissance Prize Playings ==
The time and place for a Prize Playing was determined by the four ancient masters of the school. Notices called Bills of Challenge were posted of the event and a wooden scaffolding was erected in a public square. A good number of formalities were observed and at one time rules were endorsed by the Crown. On the appointed day and time, following a procession of drums and flags the Player was paraded to the raised scaffold with much fanfare. The public gathered close to watch, cheer, and throw coins onto the platform; the student would end up making a profit at the end of the day from this. Prize events also attracted new students—from which the Company earned the major part of its income.

At the start, a senior Master would declare the name of the Player, the rank being sought, and then announce "The first bout to be at [whichever weapon]." Bouts were fought using 'blunts' (dulled and rounded weapons) and played to a number of 'hits' rather than to a 'victory'. The term "play" at the time referred to competing or practice sparring, as opposed to a life and death fight. Although not real, the fights were not displays or exhibitions. They were free-sparring practices just earnest enough to properly evaluate the Player and not arranged as public spectacle. The contact was limited, but it was at full speed. The bouts could sometimes be bloody, but never lethal. No armor was used and blows were limited to above the waist, but even the bare head and hands were targets. Only a few instances are recorded of students failing their Prize, with none ever being killed. The student had to pay for the travel expenses of 'answerers' (opponents) coming from outside London (all Masters within 36 miles were required to attend).

Two bouts had to be played with a number of different weapons against as few as four and as many as ten opponents each. To Play their Prize, a student might face in a single afternoon an average total of sixty bouts or more. These were all against more senior opponents, with little rest in between. The job of the answerers was not to break or beat the Player but to seriously test them. The 'Prize' meant promotion and the respect and acceptance of one's peers.

The fight itself consisted of those traditional English weapons as taught in the "Schole" and dating back to the early Middle Ages. For the challenged Scholar, the weapons to be judged on were fixed at Longsword and Backsword. For the Free Scholar, there was a choice of any three weapons (usually longsword, backsword, and sword & buckler). For the Provost, there was a choice of any four weapons (usually the same as the Free Scholar but also including at least one polearm). Provosts playing for their "Master's Prize" would face an agonizing ten bouts with eight weapons each, including single dagger, quarterstaff, and two-handed sword. Among the other weapons sometimes played were Morris-pike, flail, sword & dagger, and sword & gauntlet. Starting around 1580, the rapier and rapier & dagger were included.

Once all the bouts were over, judgment of passage was made by the four senior Masters. A victorious prizer might be declared “a well-tryd and sufficient man with divers weapons”. After collecting thrown change, the Player was escorted back to the school, again with great fanfare, took his oath, paid his fees, and did much drinking (which he was also expected to pay for). The whole event might even last two days.

== Prize Fights ==
During the late 17th to mid 18th centuries in England, long after the London schools and true Masters had faded, a revival of Prizing took place. But in these bouts mostly common, unskilled brawlers and street ruffians would fight for money against all challengers. They were also called "prizefighters" in reference to earlier days. Though also using blunted weapons, most of these fights were quite bloody affairs with some ending in deaths. Today, they are often confused with the old Masters and their students Playing the Prize.

Eventually, pugilism was added to the shows and it became so popular that weapons were finally dropped from the contests altogether. This is the origin of today's modern boxing "prizefights."

== See also ==
- Fechtschule
