= Historical European martial arts =

Martial arts of European origin

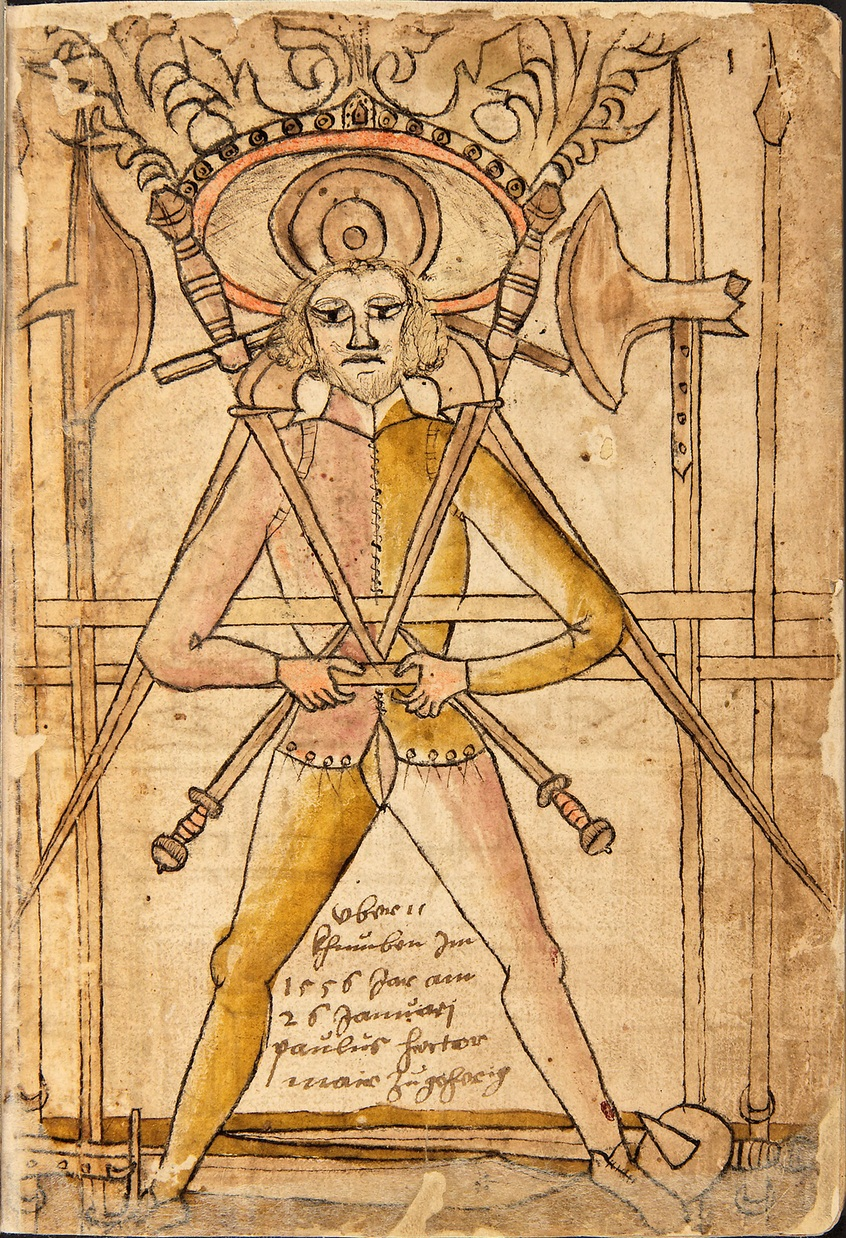
The first page of the Codex Wallerstein shows the typical arms of 15th-century individual combat, including the longsword, rondel dagger, messer, sword-and-buckler, halberd, poleaxe, spear, and staff.

Historical European martial arts (HEMA) are martial arts of European origin, particularly using arts formerly practised, but having since died out or evolved into very different forms.

While there is limited surviving documentation of the martial arts of classical antiquity (such as Greek wrestling or gladiatorial combat), most of the surviving dedicated technical treatises or martial arts manuals date to the late medieval period and the early modern period. For this reason, the focus of HEMA is de facto on the period of the half-millennium of ca. 1300 to 1800, with a German, Italian, and Spanish school flowering in the Late Middle Ages and the Renaissance (14th to 16th centuries), followed by French, English, and Scottish schools of fencing in the modern period (17th and 18th centuries). The Swedish HEMA Association Svenska HEMA-Förbundet defines HEMA as any martial art predating 1950 and has a living tradition or preserved source material.

Martial arts of the 19th century such as classical fencing, and even early hybrid styles such as Bartitsu, may also be included in the term HEMA in a wider sense, as may traditional or folkloristic styles attested in the late 19th and early 20th centuries, including forms of folk wrestling and traditional stick-fighting methods.

The term Western martial arts (WMA) is sometimes used in the United States and in a wider sense including modern and traditional disciplines. Longsword is arguably the most popular weapon trained in HEMA today. In Germany, about 92% of all HEMA clubs offer longsword training.

== History of European martial arts ==
=== Ancient history ===
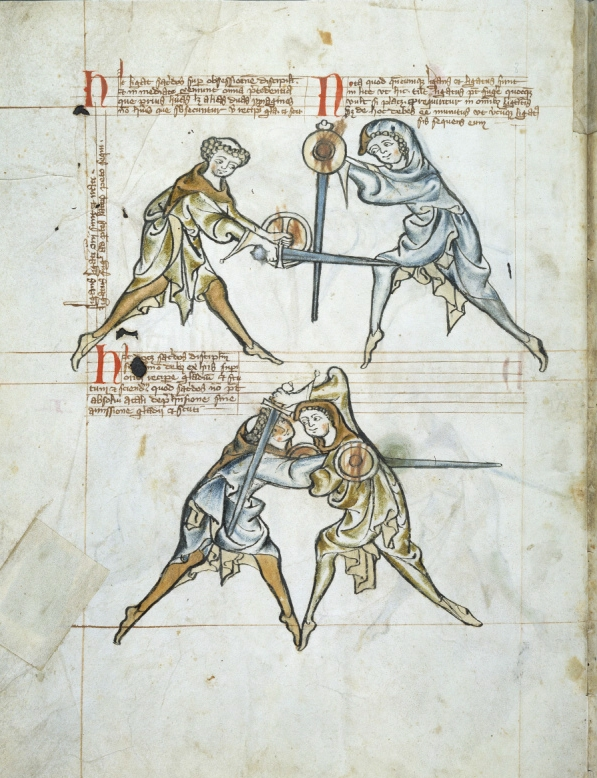
Fol. 4v of the I.33

The earliest Western book about the fighting arts currently known (c. 2025), Epitoma rei militaris, was written into Latin by a Roman writer, Publius Flavius Vegetius Renatus, who lived in Rome between the fourth and fifth centuries. There are no other known Western martial arts manuals predating the Late Middle Ages (except for fragmentary instructions on Greek wrestling, see Papyrus Oxyrhynchus 466), although medieval literature (e.g., sagas of Icelanders, Eastern Roman Acritic songs, the Digenes Akritas and Middle High German epics) record specific martial deeds and military knowledge; in addition, historical artwork depicts combat and weaponry (e.g., the Bayeux Tapestry, the Synopsis of Histories by John Skylitzes, the Morgan Bible). Some researchers have attempted to reconstruct older fighting methods such as Pankration, Eastern Roman hoplomachia, Viking swordsmanship and gladiatorial combat by reference to these sources and practical experimentation.

The Royal Armouries Ms. I.33 (pronounced "one thirty-three," also known as the Walpurgis Fechtbuch or the Tower Fechtbuch, and the Walpurgis Manuscript or the Tower manuscript), dated to c. 1300, is the oldest surviving Fechtbuch, teaching sword and buckler combat.

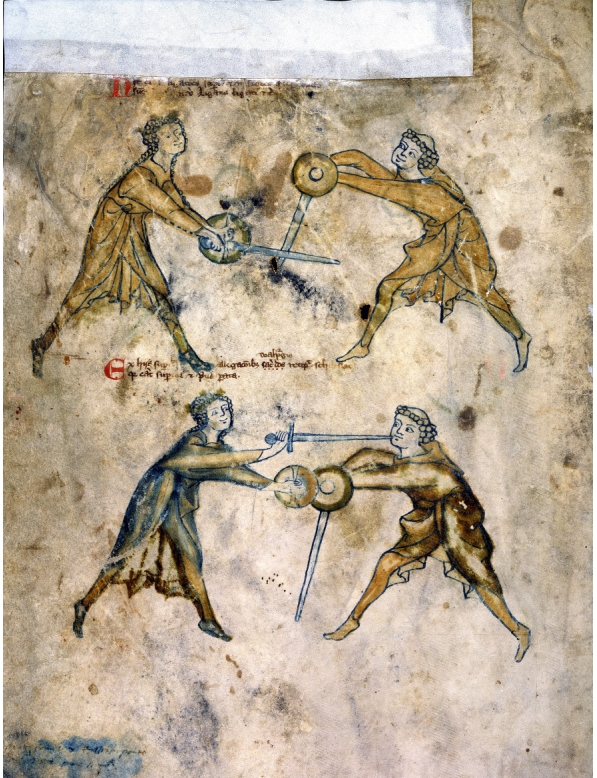
The final stage of the last sequence in the Royal Armouries Ms. I.33

The Walpurgis manuscript gives instructions on individual combat with the sword and buckler (a small, round shield) featuring the characters of a priest, a scholar, and a female who is named Walpurgis. The system contains seven basic guards and 36 sequences today. There were more but the pages were lost. The priest stands as the lead in most sequences, until the final two sequences where Walpurgis, the female character, stands in as the lead, delivering a shield-strike and a blow to the priest's head.

Significantly, the I.33 manuscript illustrates a distinctive method of using the sword and buckler, which is different from the techniques found in most subsequent fight books.

=== Post-classical history ===
The central figure of late medieval martial arts, at least in Germany, is Johannes Liechtenauer. Though no manuscript written by him is known to have survived, his teachings were first recorded in the late 14th-century Nürnberger Handschrift GNM 3227a. From the 15th to the 17th century, numerous Fechtbücher (German 'fencing-books') were produced, of which some several hundred are extant; a great many of these describe methods descended from Liechtenauer's. Liechtenauer's Zettel (recital) remains one of the most famous — if cryptic — pieces of European martial arts scholarship to this day, with several translations and interpretations of the poem being put into practice by fencers and scholars around the world.

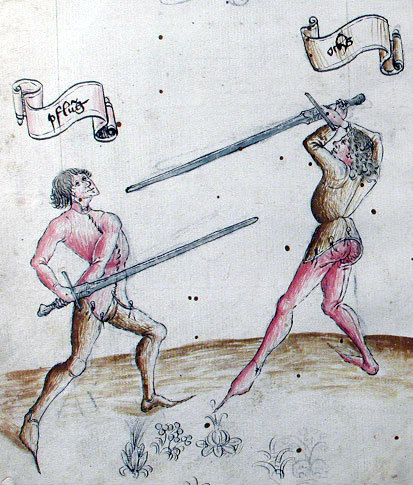
Longsword guards (1452 manuscript)

Normally, several modes of combat were taught alongside one another, typically unarmed grappling (Kampfringen or abrazare), dagger (Degen or daga, often of the rondel dagger), long knife (Messer), or Dusack, half- or quarterstaff, polearms, longsword (Langesschwert, spada longa, spadone), and combat in plate armour (Harnischfechten or armazare), both on foot and on horseback. Some Fechtbücher have sections on dueling shields (Stechschild), special weapons used only in trial by combat.

Important 15th century German fencing masters include Sigmund Ringeck, Peter von Danzig (see Cod. 44 A 8), Hans Talhoffer and Paulus Kal, all of whom taught the teachings of Liechtenauer. From the late 15th century, there were "brotherhoods" of fencers (Fechtbruderschaften), most notably the Brotherhood of St. Mark (attested 1474) and the Federfechter.

An early Burgundian French treatise is Le jeu de la hache (The Play of the Axe) of ca. 1400.

The earliest master to write in the Italian language was Fiore dei Liberi, commissioned by the Marquis di Ferrara. Between 1407 and 1410, he documented comprehensive fighting techniques in a treatise entitled Flos Duellatorum covering grappling, dagger, arming sword, longsword, pole-weapons, armoured combat, and mounted combat. The Italian school is continued by Filippo Vadi (1482–1487) and Pietro Monte (1492, Latin with Italian and Spanish terms).

Three early (before George Silver) natively English swordplay texts exist, but are all very obscure and from uncertain dates; they are generally thought to belong to the latter half of the 15th century.

=== Early modern period ===
==== Renaissance ====
In the 16th century, compendia of older Fechtbücher techniques were produced, some of them printed, notably by Paulus Hector Mair (in the 1540s) and by Joachim Meyer (in the 1570s). The extent of Mair's writing is unmatched by any other German master, and is considered invaluable by contemporary scholars.

In Germany, fencing had developed sportive tendencies during the 16th century. The treatises of Paulus Hector Mair and Joachim Meyer derived from the teachings of the earlier centuries within the Liechtenauer tradition, but with new and distinctive characteristics. The printed Fechtbuch of Jacob Sutor (1612) is one of the last in the German tradition.

In Italy, the 16th century was a period of big change. It opened with the two treatises of Bolognese masters Antonio Manciolino and Achille Marozzo, who described a variation of the eclectic knightly arts of the previous century. From sword and buckler to sword and dagger, sword alone to two-handed sword, from polearms to wrestling (though absent in Manciolino), early 16th-century Italian fencing reflected the versatility that a martial artist of the time was supposed to have achieved.

Towards the mid-16th century, however, polearms and companion weapons besides the dagger and the cape gradually began to fade out of treatises. In 1553, Camillo Agrippa was the first to define the prima, seconda, terza, and quarta guards (or hand-positions), which would remain the mainstay of Italian fencing into the next century and beyond. From the late 16th century, Italian rapier fencing attained considerable popularity all over Europe, notably with the treatise by Salvator Fabris (1606).

- Antonio Manciolino (1531, Italian)
- Achille Marozzo (1536, Italian)
- Angelo Viggiani (1551, Italian)
- Camillo Agrippa (1553, Italian)
- Jerónimo Sánchez de Carranza (1569, Spanish)
- Giacomo di Grassi (1570, Italian)
- Giovanni Dall'Agocchie (1572, Italian)
- Henry de Sainct-Didier (1573, French)
- Angelo Viggiani (1575, Italian)
- Frederico Ghisliero (1587, Italian)
- Vincentio Saviolo (1595, Italian)
- Girolamo Cavalcabo (1597, Italian)
- George Silver (1599, English)

==== Baroque style ====
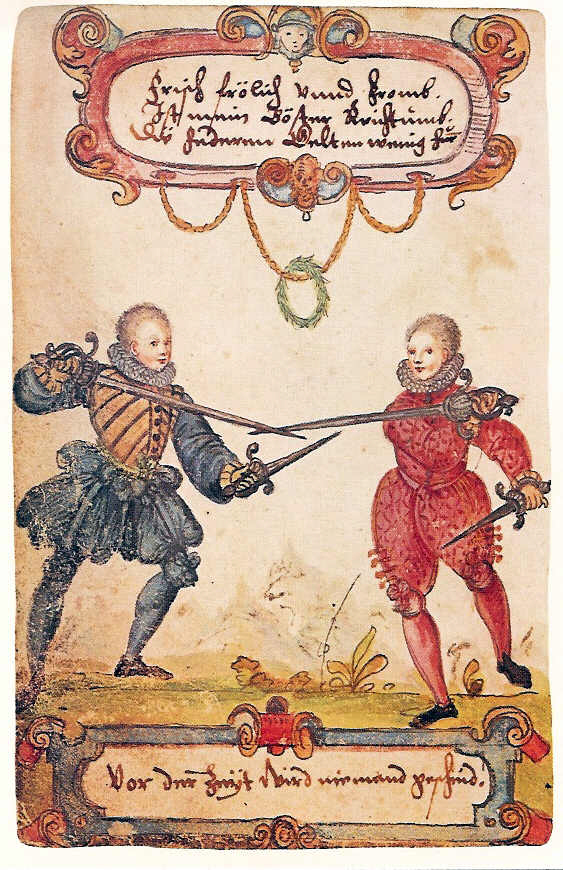
Students fencing with rapier and dagger, ca. 1590.

During the Baroque period, wrestling fell from favour among the upper classes, being now seen as unrefined and rustic. The fencing styles practice also needed to conform to the new ideals of elegance and harmony.

This ideology was taken to great lengths in Spain in particular, where La Verdadera Destreza 'the true art (of swordsmanship)' was now based on Renaissance humanism and scientific principles, contrasting with the traditional "vulgar" approach to fencing inherited from the medieval period. Significant masters of Destreza included Jerónimo Sánchez de Carranza ("the father of Destreza", d. 1600) and Luis Pacheco de Narváez (1600, 1632). Girard Thibault (1630) was a Dutch master influenced by these ideals.

The French school of fencing also moves away from its Italian roots, developing its own terminology, rules and systems of teaching. French masters of the Baroque period include Le Perche du Coudray (1635, 1676, teacher of Cyrano de Bergerac), Besnard (1653, teacher of Descartes), François Dancie (1623) and Philibert de la Touche (1670).

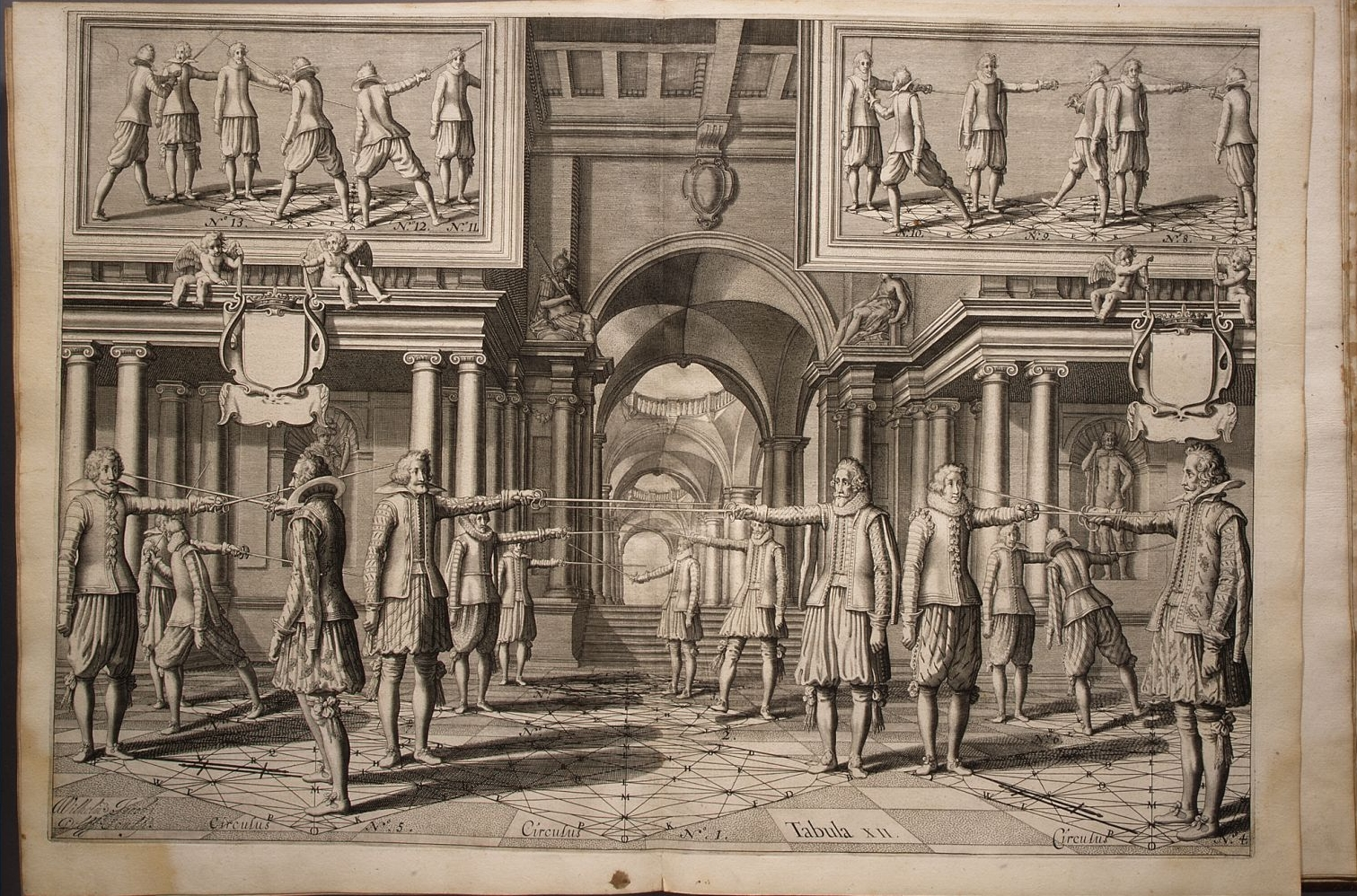
Academie de l'Espee (Girard Thibault, 1628)

In the 17th century, Italian swordsmanship was dominated by Salvator Fabris, whose De lo schermo overo scienza d'arme of 1606 exerted great influence not only in Italy, but also in Germany, where it all but extinguished the native German traditions of fencing. Fabris was followed by Italian masters such as Nicoletto Giganti (1606), Ridolfo Capo Ferro (1610), Francesco Alfieri (1640), Francesco Antonio Marcelli (1686) and Bondi' di Mazo (1696).

The Elizabethan and Jacobean eras produce English fencing writers, such as the Gentleman George Silver (1599) and the professional fencing master Joseph Swetnam (1617). The English verb to fence is first attested in Shakespeare's Merry Wives of Windsor (1597).

The French school of fencing originated in the 16th century, which is based on the Italian school, and developed into its classical form during the Baroque period.

==== Rococo style ====
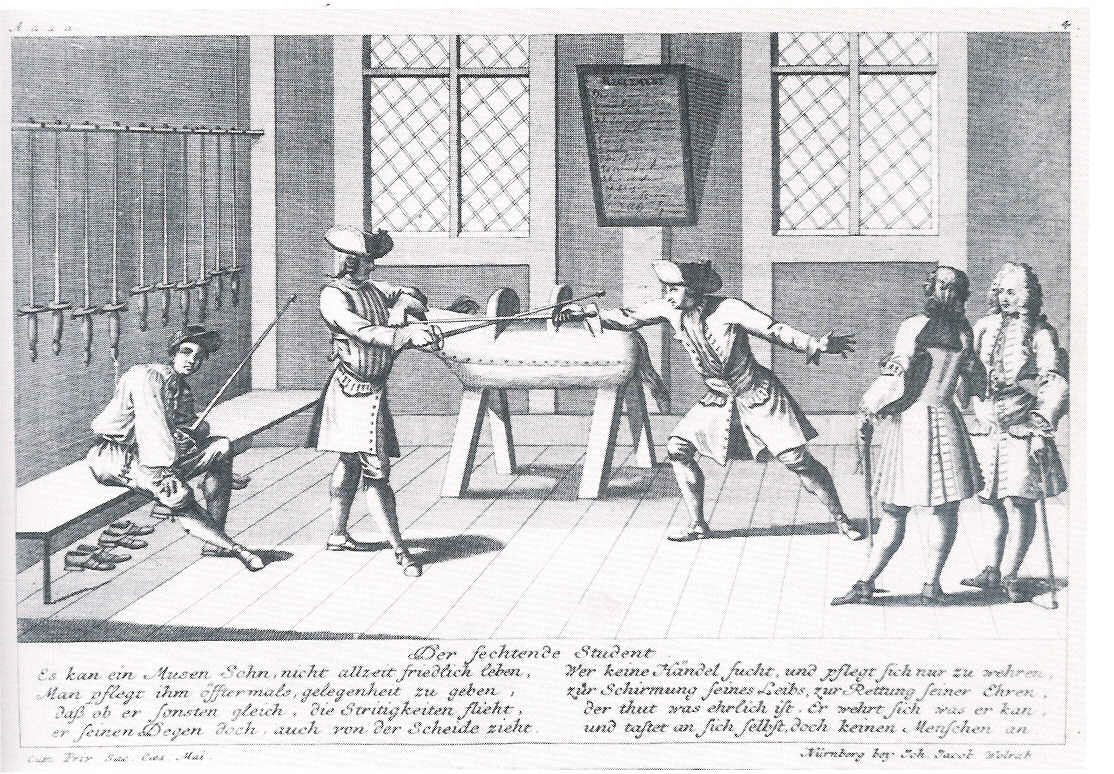
Academic fencing (1725 etching)

In the 18th century, during the late Baroque and Rococo period, the French style of fencing with the small sword and later with the foil (fleuret), originated as a training weapon for small sword fencing.

By 1715, the rapier had been largely replaced by the lighter and handier small sword throughout most of Europe, although treatments of the former continued to be included by authors such as Donald McBane (1728), P. J. F. Girard (1736) and Domenico Angelo (1763).

In this time, bare-knuckle boxing emerged as a popular sport in England and Ireland. The foremost pioneers of the sport of boxing were Englishmen James Figg and Jack Broughton.

Throughout the course of the 18th century, the French school became the western European standard to the extent that Angelo, an Italian-born master teaching in England, published his L'École des Armes in French in 1763. It was extremely successful and became a standard fencing manual over the following 50 years, throughout the Napoleonic period. Angelo's text was so influential that it was chosen to be included under the heading of Éscrime in the Encyclopédie of Diderot.

=== Late modern period ===
==== Development into modern sports ====
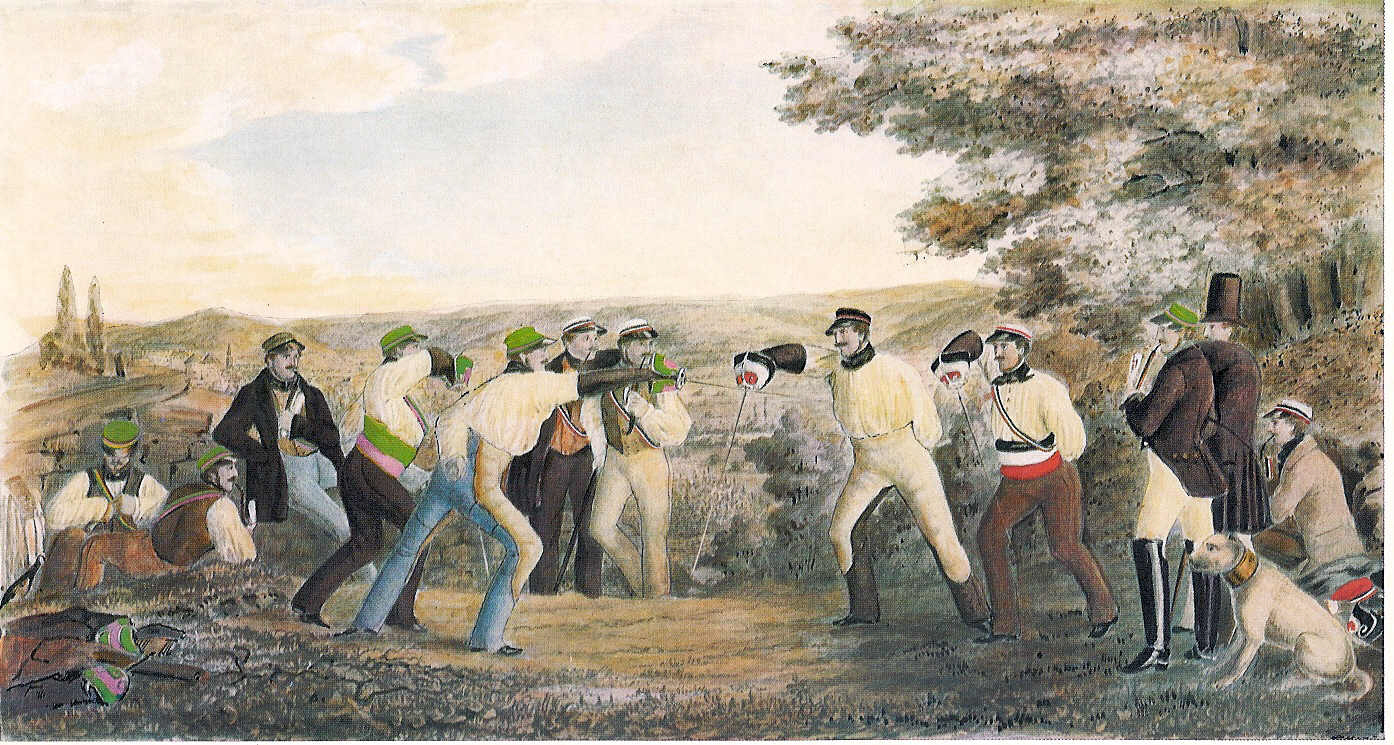
Academic fencing (1831 painting)

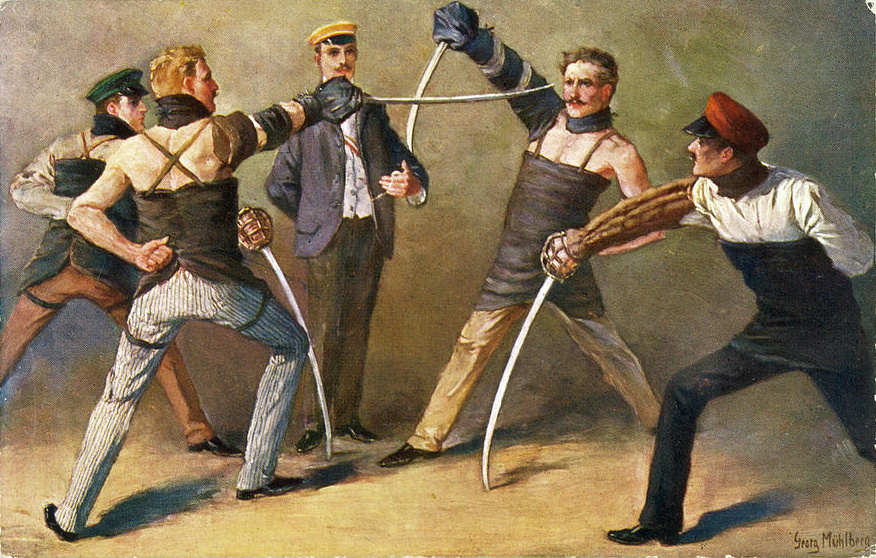
Transition to modern sports fencing: sabre fencing around 1900.

In the 19th century, Western martial arts became divided into modern sports on one-handed fencing and applications that retain military significance on the other. In the latter category are the methods of close-quarter combat with the bayonet, besides use of the sabre and the lance by cavalrists and of the cutlass by naval forces. The English longbow is another European weapon that is still used in the sport of archery.

Apart from the many styles of fencing, European combat sports of the 19th century include Boxing in England, Savate in France, and regional forms of wrestling such as Cumberland and Westmorland Wrestling, Lancashire Wrestling, and Cornish Wrestling.

Fencing in the 19th century transformed into a pure sport. While duels remained common among members of the aristocratic classes, they became increasingly frowned upon in society during the course of the century, and such duels as were fought to the death were increasingly fought with pistols, instead of bladed weapons.

==== Stick fighting ====
Styles of stick fighting include walking-stick fighting (including Irish bata or shillelagh, French la canne and English singlestick) and Bartitsu (an early hybrid of Eastern and Western schools popularized at the turn of the 20th century).

Some existing forms of European stick fighting can be traced to direct teacher-student lineages from the 19th century. Notable examples include the methods of Scottish and British Armed Services singlestick, la canne and bâton français, Portuguese jogo do pau, Italian Paranza or Bastone Siciliano, and some styles of Canarian juego del palo.

In the 19th century and early 20th century, the greatstick (pau/bâton/bastone) was employed by some Portuguese, French, and Italian military academies as a method of exercise, recreation, and as preparation for bayonet training.

A third category might be traditional "folk styles", mostly folk wrestling. Greco-Roman wrestling was a discipline at the first modern Olympic Games in 1896. Inclusion of freestyle wrestling followed in 1904.

==== 19th century revival ====
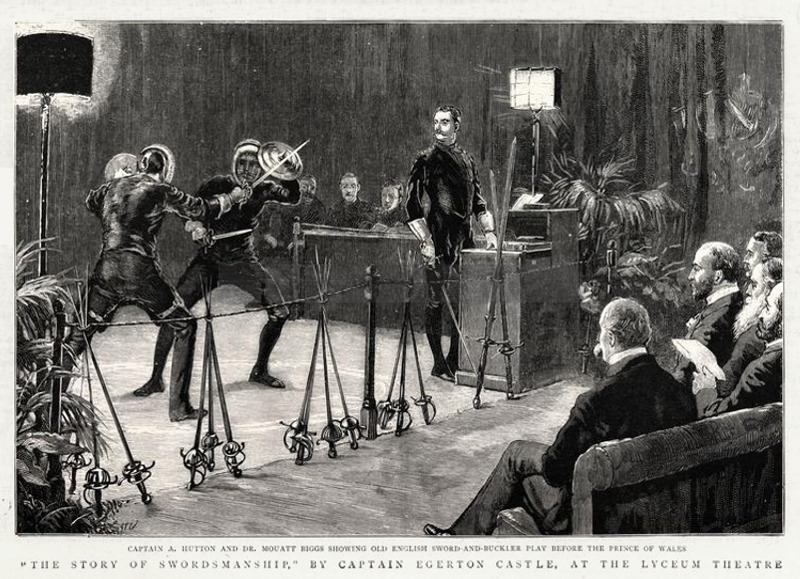
Egerton Castle, Alfred Hutton and Mouatt Biggs giving a demonstration of "Old English sword-and-buckler play" before the Prince of Wales at the Lyceum Theatre in 1891 (The Graphic).

Attempts at reconstructing the discontinued traditions of European systems of combat began in the late 19th century, with a revival of interest from the Middle Ages. The movement was led in England by the soldier, writer, antiquarian, and swordsman, Alfred Hutton.

Hutton learned fencing at the school founded by Domenico Angelo. In 1862, he organized in his regiment stationed in India the Cameron Fencing Club, for which he prepared his first work, a 12-page booklet entitled Swordsmanship.

After returning home from India in 1865, Hutton focused on the study and revival of older fencing systems and schools. He began tutoring groups of students in the art of 'ancient swordplay' at a club attached to the London Rifle Brigade School of Arms in the 1880s. In 1889, Hutton published his most influential work Cold Steel: A Practical Treatise on the Sabre, which presented the historical method of military sabre use on foot, combining the 18th century English backsword with the modern Italian duelling sabre.

Hutton's pioneering advocacy and practice of historical fencing included reconstructions of the fencing systems of several historical masters including George Silver and Achille Marozzo. He delivered numerous practical demonstrations with his colleague Egerton Castle of these systems during the 1890s, both in order to benefit various military charities and to encourage patronage of the contemporary methods of competitive fencing. Exhibitions were held at the Bath Club and a fund-raising event was arranged at Guy's Hospital.

Newspaper report on a "Ladies' night at the Bath Club" which included demonstrations in "swordsmanship, swimming, and bartitsu" (London Daily Mail, 13 June 1899).

Among his many acolytes were Egerton Castle, Captain Carl Thimm, Colonel Cyril Matthey, Captain Percy Rolt, Captain Ernest George Stenson Cooke, Captain Frank Herbert Whittow, Esme Beringer, Sir Frederick, and Walter Herries Pollock. Despite this revival and the interest that was received in late Victorian England, the practice died out soon after the death of Hutton in 1910. Interest in the physical application of historical fencing techniques remained largely dormant during the first half of the 20th century, due to a number of factors.

Similar work, although more academic than practical in nature, occurred in other European countries. In Germany, Karl Wassmannsdorf conducted research on the German school and Gustav Hergsell reprinted three of Hans Talhoffer's manuals. In France, there was the work of the Academie D'Armes circa 1880–1914. In Italy, Jacopo Gelli and Francesco Novati published a facsimile of the "Flos Duellatorum" of Fiore dei Liberi, and Giuseppe Cerri's book on the Bastone drew inspiration from the two-handed sword of Achille Marozzo. Baron Leguina's bibliography of Spanish swordsmanship is still a standard reference today.

==== 20th century ====
Starting in 1966, the Society for Creative Anachronism, an amateur medieval reenactment organization, renewed public interest in the practice of historic fighting arts, and has hosted numerous tournaments in which participants compete in simulated medieval and renaissance fighting styles using padded weapons. Dividing their focus between Heavy Armored Fighting, to simulate early medieval warfare, and adapted sport Rapier fencing, to reenact later renaissance styles, the SCA regularly holds large re-creation scenarios throughout the world. Their styles have been criticized by other groups as lacking historical authenticity, although a number of members of the group regularly engage in scholarship.

A number of researchers, principally academics with access to some of the sources, continued exploring the field of historical European martial arts from a largely academic perspective. In 1972, James Jackson published a book called Three Elizabethan Manuals of Fence. This work reprinted the works of George Silver, Giacomo di Grassi, and Vincentio Saviolo. In 1965, Martin Wierschin published a bibliography of German fencing manuals, along with a transcription of Codex Ringeck and a glossary of terms. In turn, this led to the publication of Hans-Peter Hils' seminal work on Johannes Liechtenauer in 1985.

During the mid-20th century, a small number of professional fight directors for theatre, film and television – notably including Arthur Wise, William Hobbs and John Waller, all of them British – studied historical combat treatises as inspiration for their fight choreography.

In the 1980s and 1990s, Patri J. Pugliese began making photocopies of historical treatises available to interested parties, greatly spurring on research. In 1994, with the rise of the Hammerterz Forum, a publication devoted entirely to the history of swordsmanship. During the late 1990s, translations and interpretations of historical sources began appearing in print as well as online.

== The modern HEMA community ==
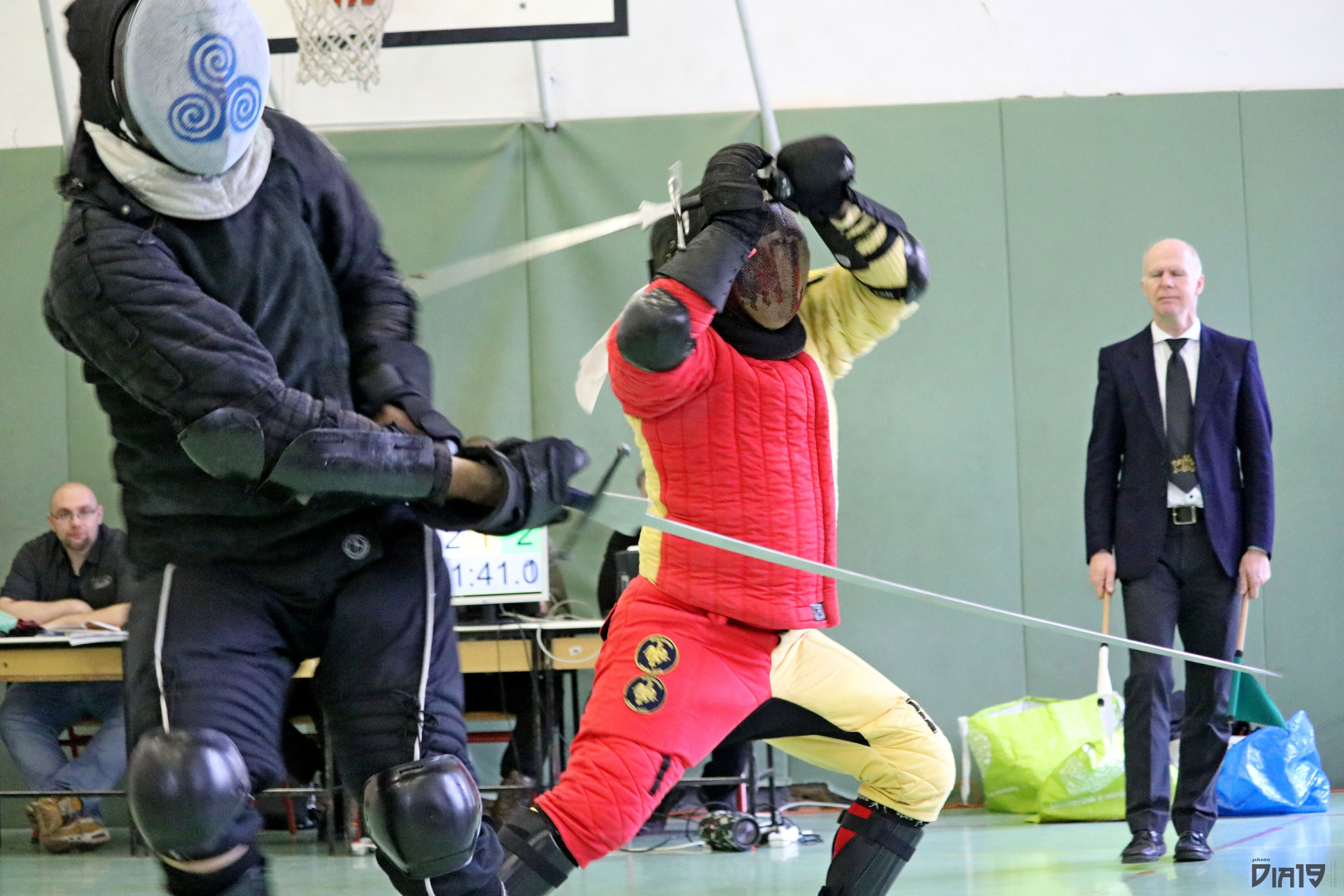
Contemporary HEMA gear is often closer in resemblance to sport fencing equipment than more traditional armour, but with more coverage and a higher impact rating than standard sport fencing gear.

Since the 1980s and 1990s, historical European martial arts communities have emerged in Europe, North America, Australia, and the wider English-speaking world. These groups attempt to reconstruct historical European martial arts using various training methods. Although the focus generally is on the martial arts of medieval and Renaissance masters, 19th- and early 20th-century martial arts teachers are also studied and their systems are reconstructed, including Edward William Barton-Wright, the founder of Bartitsu; combat savate and stick fighting master Pierre Vigny; London-based boxer and fencer Rowland George Allanson-Winn; French journalist and self-defence enthusiast Jean Joseph-Renaud; and British quarterstaff expert Thomas McCarthy.

=== Research and publications ===
Research into the rapier style of the innovative Roman, Neapolitan and Sicilian School of Fencing in Italy's 16th and 17th century was pioneered by M° Francesco Lodà, PhD, founder of Accademia Romana d'Armi in Rome, Italy. While research focused on the Marcelli family of fencing masters and their pupils in Rome and abroad (e.g. Mattei, Villardita, Marescalchi, De Greszy, Terracusa), through publication of papers and books on rapier fencing, attention was also paid to the influences of 16th century's masters active in Rome, such as Agrippa, Cavalcabò, Paternoster, or of the early 17th like D'Alessandri. Within Accademia Romana d'Armi historical research has continuously been carried out also on Fiore de' Liberi's longsword system, publishing the first Italian analysis and transcription of MS. Par. Lat. 11269, Radaelli's military saber and MS. I.33 sword and buckler, and more recently on Liechtenauer's tradition of fencing.

Research into Italian sword forms and their influence on the French styles of the late sixteenth and early seventeenth centuries has been undertaken by Rob Runacres of England's Renaissance Sword Club since 2013.

Italian traditions are mainly investigated in Italy by Sala d'Arme Achille Marozzo, where you can find studies dedicated to the Bolognese tradition, to the Italian medieval tradition by Luca Cesari and Marco Rubboli, and to the Florentine tradition by Alessandro Battistini. Central and Southern Italian traditions are also investigated by Accademia Romana d'Armi, through the studies of Francesco Lodà on Spetioli (Marche) and Pagano (Neaples). Italian rapier instructors Tom Leoni (US) and Piermarco Terminiello (UK) have published annotated English translations of some of the most important rapier treatises of the 17th century, making this fencing style available to a worldwide audience. Leoni has also authored English translations of all of Fiore de' Liberi's Italian-language manuscripts, as well as Manciolino's Opera Nova and the third book of Viggiani's Lo Schermo. Ken Mondschein, one of the few professional academics working in this field, translated Camillo Agrippa's treatise of 1553 as well as the Paris manuscript of Fiore dei Liberi and written several academic articles.

The martial traditions of the Netherlands are researched by Reinier van Noort, who additionally focuses on German and French martial sources of the 17th century.

The ongoing study of the Germanic Langes Messer is most notably represented by the work of Jens Peter Kleinau and Martin Enzi. Dierk Hagedorn has also published significant translations.

Leading researchers on Manuscript I.33's style of fence include Roland Warzecha, at the head of the Dimicator fencing school in Germany.

Other fencing traditions are represented in the scholarship of Stephen Hand and Paul Wagner of Australia's Stoccata School of Defence, focusing on a range of systems, ranging from the works of George Silver and the techniques depicted in the Royal Armouries' Manuscript I.33 to the surviving evidence for how large shields were used, rapier according to Saviolo and Swetnam and Scottish Highland broadsword.

Christian Henry Tobler is one of the earliest researchers on the German school of swordsmanship.

Early publications also included books by Terry Brown, John Clements, David M. Cvet (self-published in 2001). In 2003, Stephen Hand edited a collection of scholarly papers titled SPADA, followed by a second volume in 2005. Since the mid-2000s, the rate of publication of HEMA related texts has greatly increased. A list of current publications is included below.

=== Events ===
Since 1998, Sala d'Arme Achille Marozzo has organized an annual championship in Italy. Due to the excessive number of participants, in 2011 this competitive event was split in two separate events: military weapons (in autumn) and civil weapons (in spring), extending the organization in a larger coalition of Italian HEMA clubs. Civilian weapons include single sword, sword and cape, sword and dagger, and sword and Brocchiero (Buckler). The military weapons are the two-handed sword, spear, shield and spear, sword and targe, and sword and rotella. The civil weapons championship is one of the largest HEMA tournaments in the world.

Since 1999, a number of HEMA groups have held the Western Martial arts Workshop (WMAW) in the United States. In 2000, The Association for Renaissance Martial Arts (ARMA), then known as the "Historical Armed Combat Association" (HACA), hosted the Inaugural Swordplay Symposium International conference bringing together many of the then leading researchers from the US, Europe and Australia. Since 2003, ARMA has held the ARMA International Gathering every two to three years. The Fiore-oriented Schola Saint George has hosted a Medieval Swordsmanship Symposium annually in the United States since 2001.

The annual Australian Historical Swordplay Convention, primarily a teaching event was hosted and attended by diverse Australian groups from 1999 to 2006. It was held in Brisbane in 1999 and 2006, Sydney in 2000 and 2004, Canberra in 2001 and 2005, the Gold Coast in 2003 and Melbourne in 2004. Since 2009, Swordplay, a tournament event has been run each year in Brisbane.

Since 2002, Royal Arts Fencing Academy and the Rose & Gold foundation have hosted Ascalon Sword Festival, one of the largest HEMA tournaments in the United States. The event covers Olympic fencing, as well as the HEMA disciplines of longsword, rapier and dagger, military saber, and Harnischfechten. It was originally part of the larger Arnold Sports Festival as the Arnold Fencing Classic.

Since 2004, FightCamp has been running and it is organized by London-based Schola Gladiatoria.

Since 2006, a Swedish annual event called Swordfish has been taking place every year in Gothenburg, hosted by the Gothenburg Historical Fencing School (GHFS). It is currently one of the biggest HEMA tournaments in the world and is generally considered to be the "world cup of HEMA".

Since 2006, a Canadian event called Nordschlag has been taking place annually in Edmonton, Alberta, hosted by The Academy of European Swordsmanship (The AES). It is Canada's first interprovincial tournament, and currently largest Canadian tournament, and has participants from all over Western Canada. The event also includes a full day workshop that features international and local instructors.

Since 2010, The annual Pacific Northwest HEMA Gathering has been hosted by multiple schools and clubs in the Pacific Northwest. The tournament includes longsword, singlestick, glima, and one rotating weapon which is changed every year. The location of the event changes every year, and has been located at Fort Casey and Pacific Lutheran University.

Since 2011, a biannual event called the Vancouver International Swordplay Symposium, has been held in Vancouver, Canada. Hosted by Academie Duello, this event has brought instructors, authors and researchers from around the world for workshops, lectures and seminars.

Since 2012, the annual event SoCal Sword Fight has been hosted in Southern California. The event includes tournaments and classes in a variety of historical weapons, including some non-European weapons. In February 2023, the event had 329 registered fighters and over 500 participants.

Since 2013, an annual event, Fechtschule Edinburgh, an event focusing on 16th century Fencing has been hosted in Edinburgh, UK, by the Stork's Beak: School of Historical Swordplay. This Event has attracted many practitioners from around the world.

Since 2014, the Purpleheart Armoury Open has been held in Houston, TX. Formerly Fechtshule America, the Purpleheart Armoury Open is one of the largest and fastest growing HEMA competitions in North America.

Since 2014, Espoon Historiallisen Miekkailun Seura in Espoo, Finland has hosted the Helsinki Longsword Open. In 2026, the number of competitors totaled 217 with fighters from more than two dozen countries.

In 2015, Australia's Stoccata School of Defence hosted a revival of the World Broadsword Championship in Sydney, Australia. This event, held throughout the late 19th century in England, the United States and Australia was last won by Parker in Sydney in 1891. Parker was never challenged. The 2015 event was won by Paul Wagner of Sydney, also the current holder of the Glorianna Cup, the broadsword championship of Britain. Lewis Hand of Hobart, Australia won the junior title. In the tradition of the 19th century title, the championship is held in the home town of the current Champion. As such the next championship will be held in Sydney in early 2017.

Jousting tournaments have become more common, with jousters travelling internationally to compete. These include a number organised by an expert in the joust, Arne Koets, including The Grand Tournament of Sankt Wendel and The Grand Tournament at Schaffhausen

Another event type that is becoming more common is the sparring camp/fight camp. These events are often more casual than tournaments, with events and competitions not typical of more formal tournaments, and an emphasis on classes and sparring.

=== Umbrella groups ===
In 1998, the British Federation for Historical Swordplay was established as an umbrella organisation for UK groups.

In 2001, the Historical European Martial Arts Coalition (HEMAC) was created to act as an umbrella organization for groups in Europe, with 4 sets of goals:

Martial
reconstruct historical martial arts from primary sources; refine interpretations into viable, effective martial arts; test martial skills in a variety of competitive environments
Research
locate, transcribe, translate primary sources; have a better understanding of the socio-historical context of the arts
Outreach
promote and publicise HEMA; dispel misconceptions & stereotypes; educate the general public
Community
establish a network of individuals and groups devoted to HEMA; foster close friendships and a sense of community among members; organise at least one annual HEMAC event. Since 2002, HEMAC has organized the annual International Historical European Martial arts Gathering in Dijon, France.

In 2003, the Australian Historical Swordplay Federation became the umbrella organization for groups in Australia.

In 2010, several dozen HEMA schools and clubs from around the world united under the umbrella of the HEMA Alliance, a US-based martial arts federation dedicated to developing and sharing the Historical European Martial Arts and assisting HEMA schools and instructors with such things as instructor certification, insurance, and equipment development.

In 2012, Ruth García Navarro and Mariana López Rodríguez started Esfinges, an umbrella affinity group for women in or interested in HEMA. The goal of Esfinges is to encourage more participation of underrepresented genders in HEMA, and to support those already practicing the discipline.

== See also ==
- Armored combat (sport)
- Arne Koets
- Historical European Martial Arts in Australia
- Combat reenactment
- English Longsword School
- Fencing
- French school of fencing
- German school of swordsmanship
- Italian school of swordsmanship
- Laurentius Guild
- Martial arts manual
- Spanish school of swordsmanship
- Renaissance Sword Club
- SCA Armoured Combat
- Schola Gladiatoria
- Swordsmanship
- Waster
- History of physical training and fitness
