= History of fencing =

Evolution of ancient battlefield combat into an organised sport

The oldest surviving manual on western swordsmanship dates back to the 14th century, although historical references date fencing schools back to the 12th century.

Modern fencing originated in the 18th century, influenced by the Italian school of fencing of the Renaissance as modified by the French school.

== Terminology ==
The English term fencing, in the sense of "the action or art of using the sword scientifically" (OED), dates to the late 16th century, when it denoted systems designed for the Renaissance rapier. It is derived from the latinate defence (while conversely, the Romance term for fencing, scherma, escrima are derived from the Germanic (Old Frankish) *skrim "to shield, cover, defend").

The verb to fence derived from the noun fence, originally meaning "the act of defending", etymologically derived from Old French defens "defence", ultimately from the Latin. The first attestation of Middle English fens "defence" dates to the 14th century; the derived meaning "to surround with a fence" dates to c. 1500.

The first known English use of fence in reference to Renaissance swordsmanship is in William Shakespeare's Merry Wives of Windsor, (act i, scene 1), "with playing at sword and dagger with a master of fence," , and later, (act 2, scene 3) "Alas sir, I cannot fence" the term "fencer" is used in Much Ado About Nothing, "blunt as the fencer's foils, which hit, but hurt not." This specialized usage replaced the generic fight (Old English feohtan, cognate with the German fechten, which remains the standard term for "fencing" in Modern German).

== Antiquity ==
The origins of armed combat are prehistoric, beginning with club, spear, axe, and knife. Fighting with shield and sword developed in the Bronze Age; bladed weapons such as the khopesh appeared in the Middle Bronze Age and the proper sword in the Late Bronze Age.

The first historical evidence from archaeology of a fencing contest was found on the wall of a temple within Egypt built at a time dated to approximately 1190 B.C.

Homer's Iliad includes some of the earliest descriptions of combat with shield, sword and spear, usually between two heroes who pick one another for a duel. Roman gladiators engaged in dual combat in a sport-like setting, evolving out of Etruscan ritual. Tomb frescoes from Paestum (4th century BC) show paired fighters with helmets, spears and shields, in a propitiatory funeral blood rite that anticipates gladiator games.

Romans who frequented the gymnasia and baths often fenced with a stick whose point was covered with a ball. Vegetius, the Late Roman military writer, described practicing against a post and fencing with other soldiers. Vegetius describes how the Romans preferred the thrust over the cut, because puncture wounds enter the vital organs directly whereas cuts are often stopped by armour and bone. Raising the arm to deliver a cut exposes the side to a thrust. This doctrine was exploited by Italian fencing masters in the 16th Century and became the primary rationale behind both the Italian and French schools of fencing.

== Middle Ages and Renaissance ==
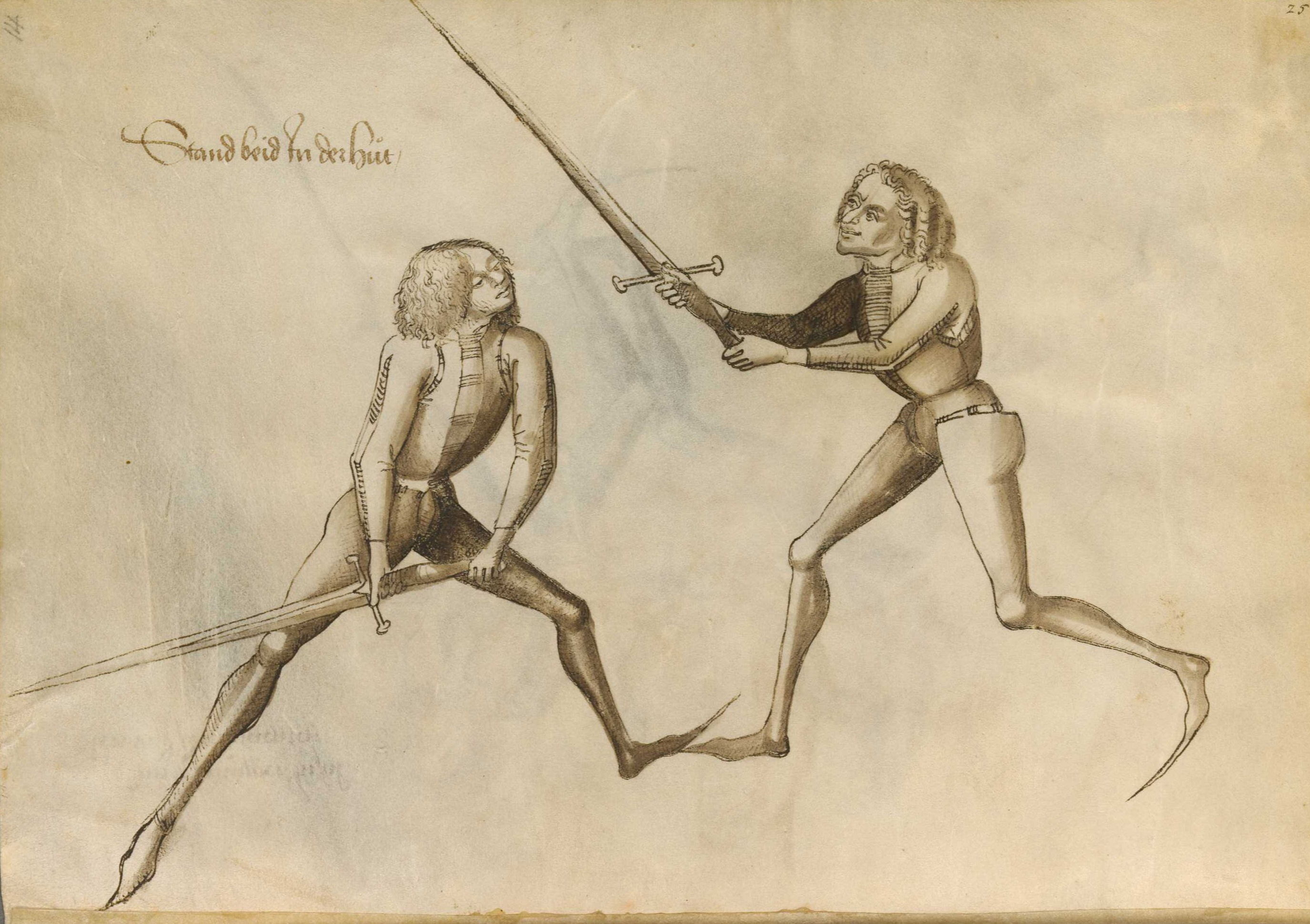
Unarmoured longsword fighters (plate 25 of the 1467 manual of Hans Talhoffer).

Sword fighting schools can be found in European historical records dating back to the 12th century. In later times sword fighting teachers were paid by rich patrons to produce books about their fighting systems, called treatises. Sword fighting schools were forbidden in some European cities (particularly in England and France) during the medieval period, though court records show that such schools operated illegally.

The earliest surviving treatise on sword fighting, stored at the Royal Armouries Museum in Leeds, England, dates from around 1300 AD and is from Germany. It is known as I.33 and written in medieval Latin and Middle High German and deals with an advanced system of using the sword and buckler (smallest shield) together.

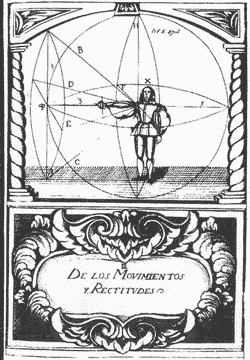
"De los Movimientos y Rectitudes", Spanish Verdadera Destreza figure.

From 1400 onward, an increasing number of sword fighting treatises survived from across Europe, with the majority from the 15th century coming from Germany and Italy. In this period these arts were largely reserved for the knighthood and the nobility – hence most treatises deal with knightly weapons such as the rondel dagger, longsword, spear, pollaxe and armoured fighting mounted and on foot. Some treatises cover weapons available to the common classes, such as großes Messer and sword and buckler. Wrestling, both with and without weapons, armoured and unarmoured, was also featured heavily in the early sword fighting treatises.

This was followed by a number of treatises, primarily from Germany and Italy, with the oldest surviving Italian treatise being Fior di Battaglia by Fiore dei Liberi, written c. 1400.

In Spain, Diego de Valera published a treatise on fencing in 1471 (in spite of the title, the book of Diego de Valera was mainly focused on heraldry). Fencing practice went through a revival, with the Marxbruder group, sometime about 1487 A.D. the group having formed some form of Fencing Guild. Francisco Román published in 1532 the Tratado de la esgrima con figuras. It meant a change in the approach to fencing, with a more mathematical approach, and started a new tradition in Spanish fencing. The Spanish rapier was apparently introduced to England during a time circa to 1540 (according to listings of the armoury of Henry the VIII^{th}). During 1587 a certain Rowland Yorke (of otherwise ill-repute) might have introduced a particular technique with the rapier-sword to somewhere in England.

In 1582 was finally published Jerónimo Carranza's seminal treatise De la Filosofía de las Armas y de su Destreza y la Aggression y Defensa Cristiana, one of the main works of the Spanish tradition on Verdadera Destreza. Its precepts are based on reason, geometry, and tied to intellectual, philosophical, and moral ideals, incorporating various aspects of a well-rounded Renaissance humanist education, with a special focus on the writings of classical authors such as Aristotle, Euclid or Plato. Its represents a break from an older tradition of fencing in Spain, the so-called esgrima vulgar or esgrima común ('vulgar or common fencing'). That older tradition, with roots in medieval times, was represented by the works of authors such as Jaime Pons [es; ca] (1474), Pedro de la Torre (1474) and Francisco Román (1532). Writers on destreza took great care to distinguish their "true art" from the "vulgar" or "common" fencing. The older school continued to exist alongside la verdadera destreza, with Spanish soldiers working as fencing masters across Europe, but was increasingly influenced by the new destreza forms and concepts.

During the 16th century the Italian masters Agrippa, Capo ferro, di Grassi, Fabris, Giganti, Marozzo, and Viggiani wrote treatises which established Italy as the originator of modern fencing.

By the 16th century, with the widespread adoption of the printing press, the increase in the urban population and other social changes, the number of treatises increased dramatically. After around 1500 carrying swords became more acceptable in most parts of Europe. The growing middle classes meant that more men could afford to carry swords, learn fighting and be seen as gentlemen. By the middle of the 16th century, many European cities contained great numbers of swordsmanship schools and fencing was invented with the invention of the rapier. Often schools clustered together, such as in London at "Hanging Sword Lane". Italian fencing masters were particularly popular and set up schools in many foreign cities. The Italians brought concepts of science to the art, appealing to the Renaissance mindset.

In 16th-century Germany compendia of older Fechtbücher techniques were produced, some of them printed; notably by Paulus Hector Mair (in the 1540s) and by Joachim Meyer (in the 1570s) and based on 14th-century teachings of the Liechtenauer tradition. In this period German fencing developed sportive tendencies.

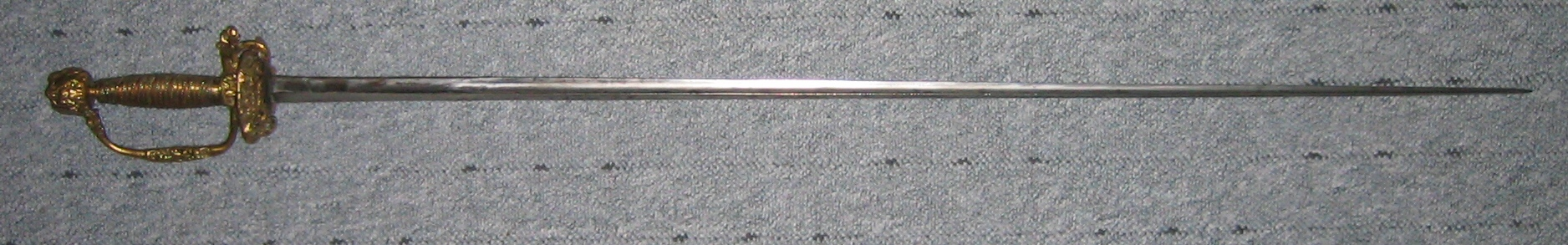
Typical smallsword of the 1740s.

The rapier's popularity peaked in the 16th and 17th centuries. The Dardi school of the 1530s, as exemplified by Achille Marozzo, still taught the two-handed spadone, but preferred the single–handed sword. The success of Italian masters such as Marozzo and Fabris outside of Italy shaped a new European mainstream of fencing. One master, Girolamo Cavalcabo of Bologna, was employed by the French Court to tutor the future Louis XIII in fencing, and his influence may be seen in later French treatises, such as that by François Dancie in 1623.

The Ecole Française d'Escrime founded in 1567 under Charles IX produced masters such as Henry de Sainct-Didier who introduced the French fencing terminology that remains in use today.

Rapier gave rise to the first recognisable ancestor of modern foil: a training weapon with a narrow triangular blade and a flat "nail head" point. Such a weapon (with a swept hilt and a rapier length blade) is on display at the Royal Armouries Museum. However, the first known version of foil rules only came to be written down towards the end of the 17th century (also in France).

== Early modern period ==
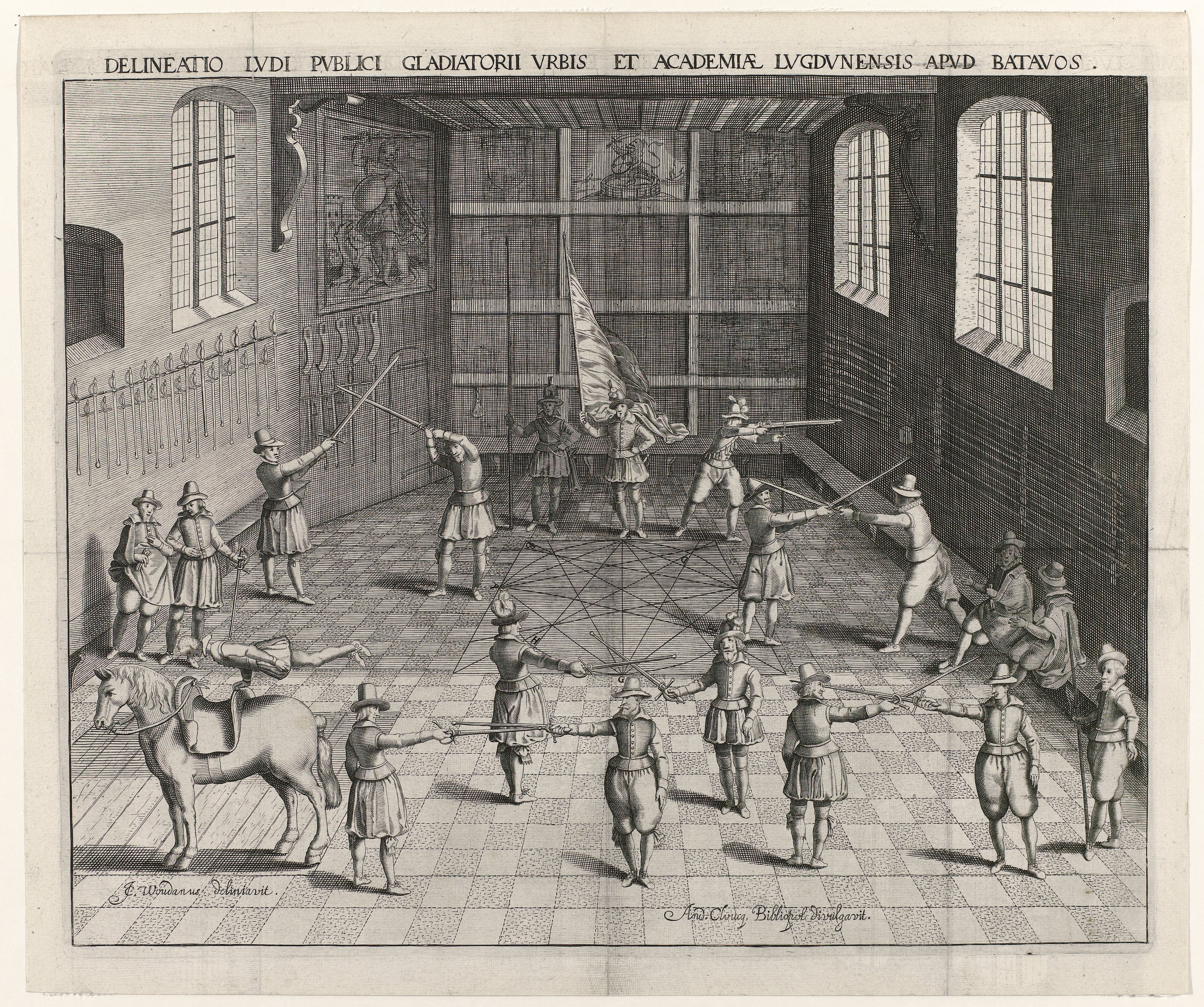
Fencing School at Leiden University, 1610

Fencing was a popular form of staged entertainment in 16th- and 17th-century England. It was also a fashionable (although somewhat controversial) martial art. In 1540 Henry VIII granted a monopoly on the running of fencing schools in London to The Company of Masters. Fencers were specifically included in the 1597 Vagabonds Act ("all fencers, bearwards, common players of interludes, and minstrels"). A number of notable fencing masters from the late 16th century (Vincentio Saviolo, Rocco Bonetti, and William Joyner) ran schools in and around Blackfriars (then the main theatre district of London).

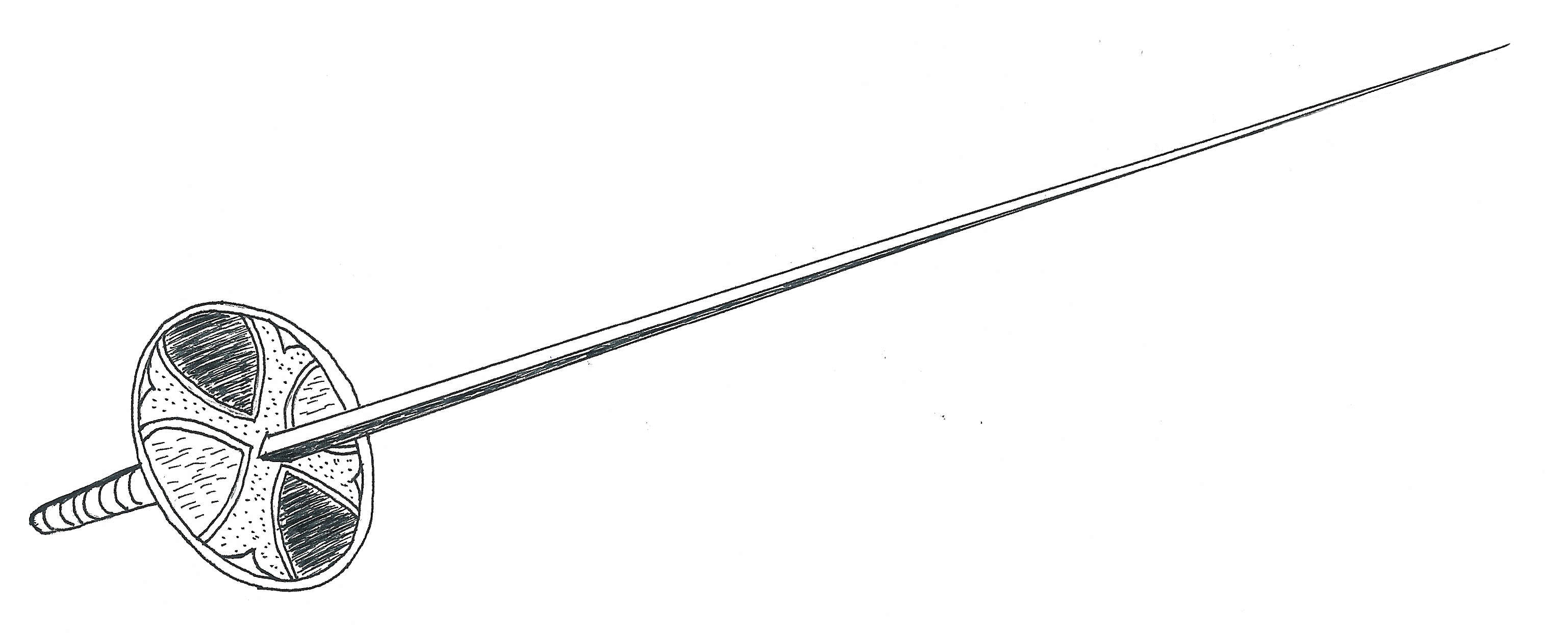
"Pariser" small sword, derived from the French foil.

Around the same time, a number of significant fencing manuals were written in or translated into English. Prizefights were bloody but rarely lethal. Samuel Pepys describes visiting at least two prizefights held in London's Beargarden in 1667 – the contestants were tradesmen rather than fencing masters; both fights ended after one of the contestants was unable to continue because of wrist injuries. On the whole, the English public opinion of fencing during this period was rather low; it was viewed in much the same light as cage fighting today.

An almost exclusively thrusting style first became popular in France during the 17th century. The French were enthusiastic adopters of the smallsword, which was light and short, and, therefore, well suited to fast, intricate handwork. Light, smaller training weapons were developed on the basis of an existing template: narrow rectangular blade with a "nail head" at the end. The first documented competition with rules resembling contemporary foil took place in Toulouse in the late 17th century.

== Academic and classical fencing ==
Brawling and fighting were regular occupations of students in the German-speaking areas during the early modern period. In line with developments in the aristocracy and the military, regulated duels were introduced to the academic environment, as well. Students wore special clothes, developed special kinds of festivities, sang student songs, and fought duels.

The foil was invented in France as a training weapon in the middle of the 18th century to practice fast and elegant thrust fencing. Fencers blunted the point by wrapping a foil around the blade or fastening a knob on the point ("blossom", French fleuret). In addition to practising, some fencers took away the protection and used the sharp foil for duels. German students took up that practice and developed the Pariser ("Parisian") thrusting small sword for the Stoßmensur ("thrusting mensur"). After the dress sword was abolished, the Pariser became the only weapon for academic thrust fencing in Germany.

Since fencing on thrust with a sharp point is quite dangerous, many students died from their lungs being pierced (Lungenfuchser), which made breathing difficult or impossible. However, the counter movement had already started in Göttingen in the 1760s. Here the Göttinger Hieber was invented, the predecessor of the modern Korbschläger, a new weapon for cut fencing. In the following years, the Glockenschläger was invented in east German universities for cut fencing as well.

Thrust fencing (using Pariser) and cut fencing (using Korbschläger or Glockenschläger) existed in parallel in Germany during the first decades of the 19th century—with local preferences. So thrust fencing was especially popular in Jena, Erlangen, Würzburg and Ingolstadt/Landshut, two towns where the predecessors of LMU Munich were located. The last thrust Mensur is recorded to have taken place in Würzburg in 1860.

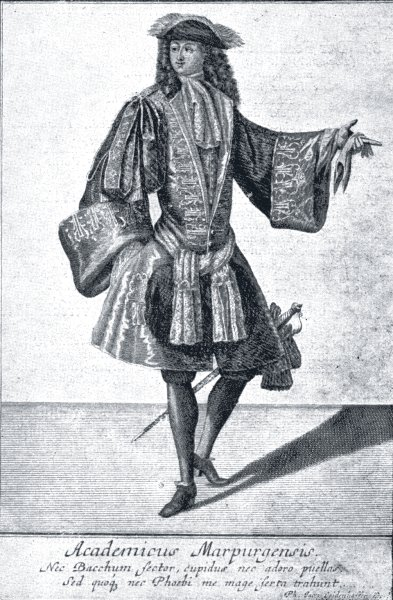
Marburg student of about 1700. Academic fencing emerged as a stylised way for German students to defend their honour.

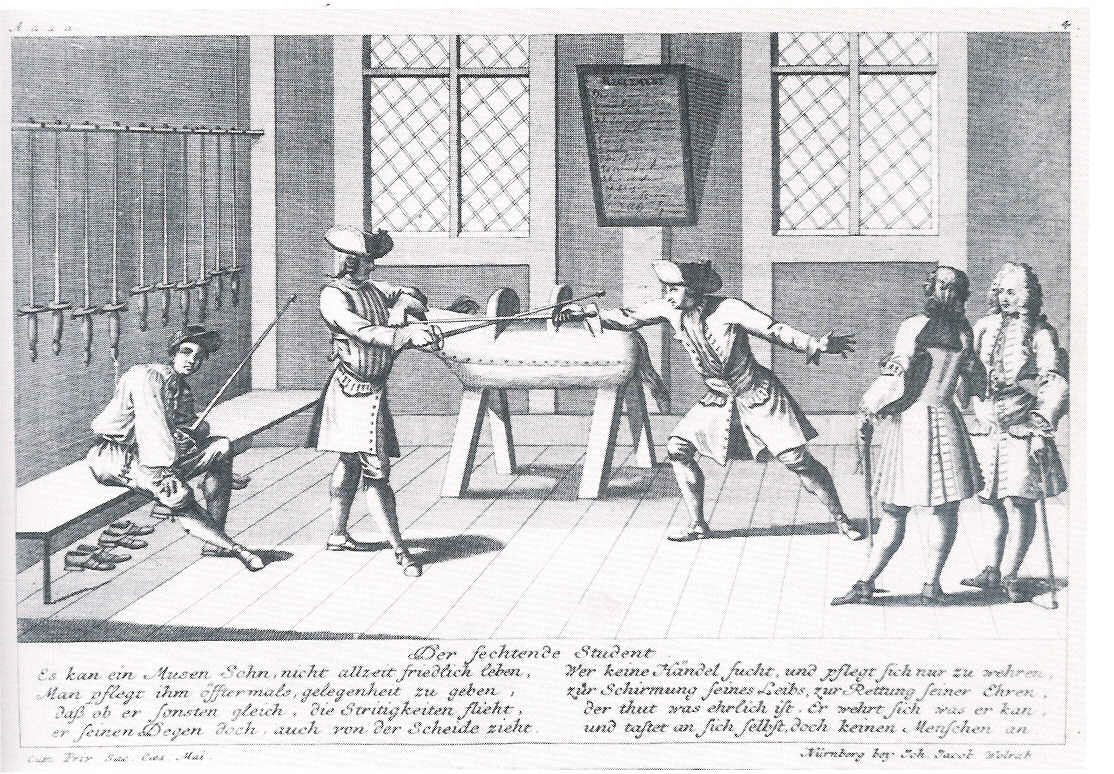
Fencing lesson at the university fencing school in Altdorf, 1725

Until the first half of the 19th century, all types of academic fencing can be seen as duels, since fencing with sharp weapons was about honour. No combat with sharp blades took place without a formal insult. For duels involving non-students, e.g. military officers, the academic sabre became usual, apparently derived from the military sabre. It was then a heavy weapon with a curved blade and a hilt similar to the Korbschläger.

Classical fencing derives most directly from the 19th- and early 20th-century national fencing schools, especially in Italy and France, although other pre–World War II styles such as Russian and Hungarian are also considered classical. Masters and legendary fencing figures such as Giuseppe Radaelli, Louis Rondelle, Masaniello Parise, the Greco brothers, Aldo Nadi and his rival Lucien Gaudin were typical practitioners of this period.

Dueling went into sharp decline after World War I. Training for duels, once fashionable for males of aristocratic backgrounds (although fencing masters such as Hope suggest that many people considered themselves trained from taking only one or two lessons), all but disappeared, along with the classes themselves. Fencing continued as a sport, with tournaments and championships. However, the need to actually prepare for a duel with "sharps" vanished, changing both training and technique.

== Development into a sport ==
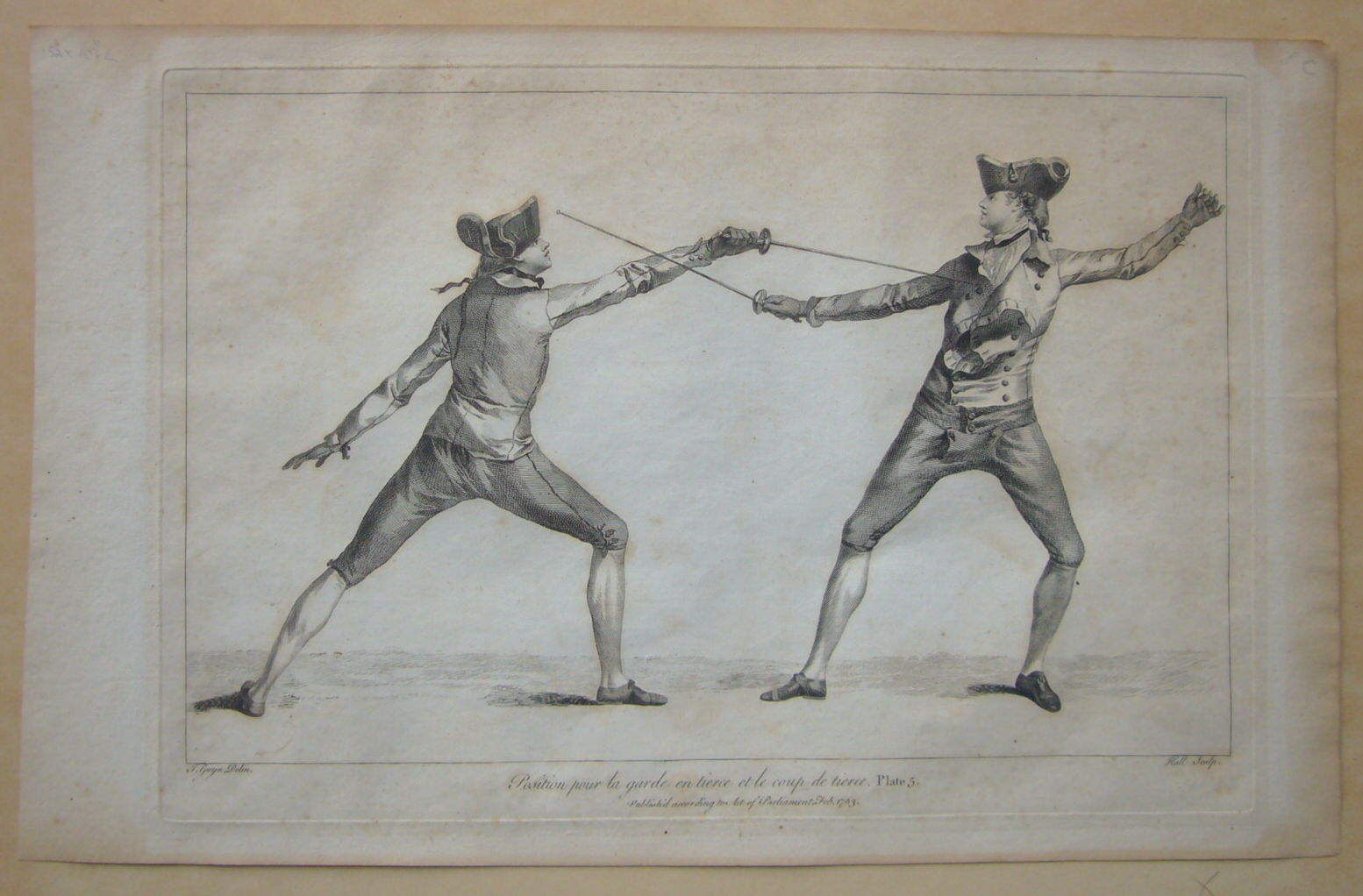
1763 fencing print from Domenico Angelo's instruction book. Angelo was instrumental in turning fencing into an athletic sport.

The need to train swordsmen for combat in a nonlethal manner led fencing and swordsmanship to include a sport aspect from its beginnings, from before the medieval tournament right up to the modern age.

The shift towards fencing as a sport rather than as military training happened from the mid-18th century, and was led by Domenico Angelo, who established a fencing academy, Angelo's School of Arms, in Carlisle House, Soho, London in 1763. There, he taught the aristocracy the fashionable art of swordsmanship which they had previously had to go to the continent to learn, and also set up a riding school in the former rear garden of the house. He was fencing instructor to the Royal Family. With the help of artist Gwyn Delin, he had an instruction book published in England in 1763 which had 25 engraved plates demonstrating classic positions from the old schools of fencing. His school was run by three generations of his family and dominated the art of European fencing for almost a century.

He established the essential rules of posture and footwork that still govern modern sport fencing, although his attacking and parrying methods were still much different from current practice. Although he intended to prepare his students for real combat, he was the first fencing master yet to emphasize the health and sporting benefits of fencing more than its use as a killing art, particularly in his influential book L’École des armes (The School of Fencing), published in 1763. According to the Encyclopædia Britannica, "Angelo was the first to emphasize fencing as a means of developing health, poise, and grace. As a result of his insight and influence, fencing changed from an art of war to a sport."

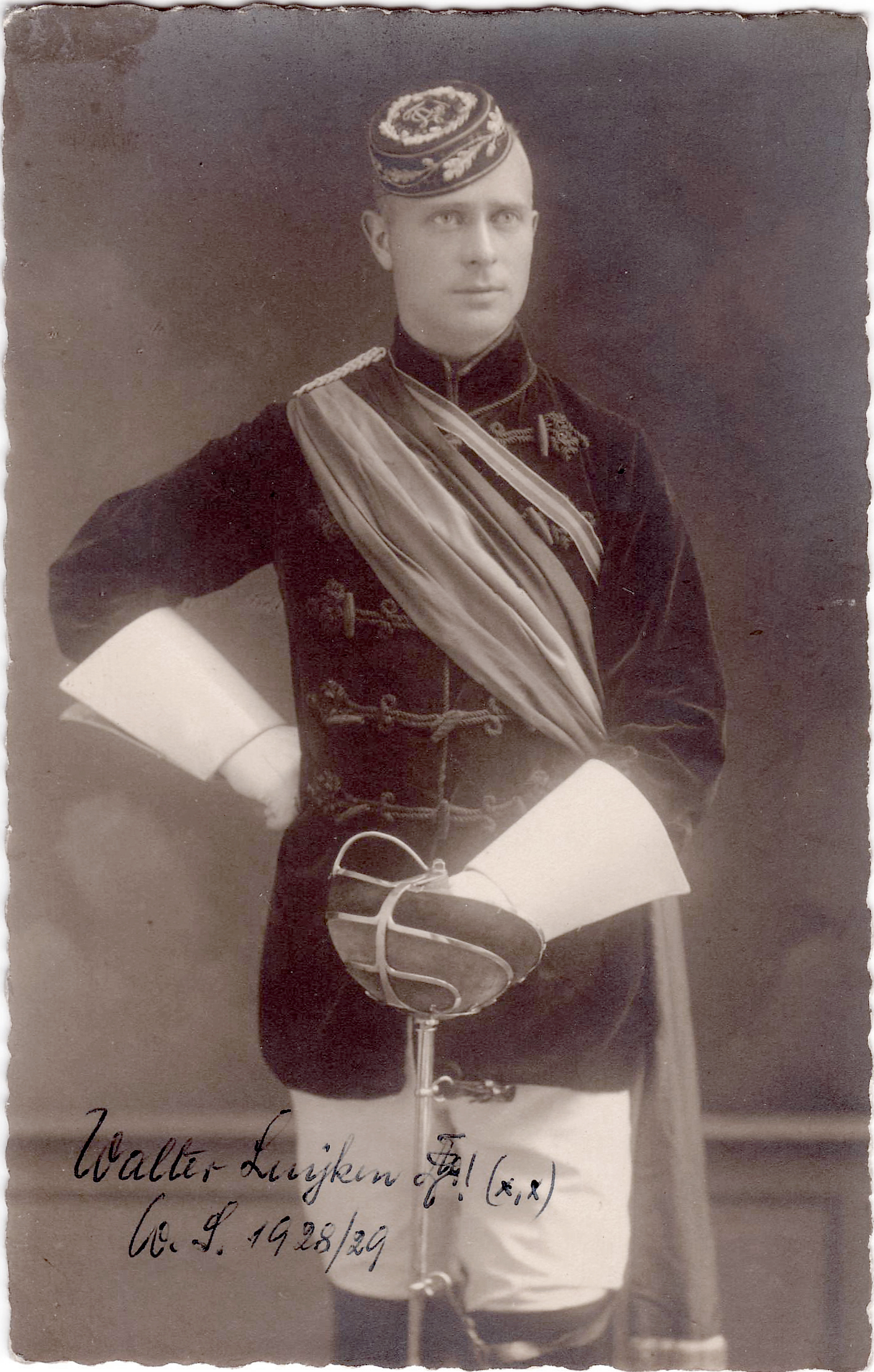
Corporate student of the "Agronomia" in Bonn 1928/1929.

As fencing progressed, the combat aspect slowly faded until only the rules of the sport remained. While the fencing taught in the late 19th and early 20th centuries was intended to serve both for competition and the duel (while understanding the differences between the two situations), the type of fencing taught in a modern sport fencing salle is intended only to train the student to compete in the most effective manner within the rules of the sport.

The first regularized fencing competition was held at the inaugural Grand Military Tournament and Assault at Arms in 1880, held at the Royal Agricultural Hall, in Islington in June. The Tournament featured a series of competitions between army officers and soldiers. Each bout was fought for five hits and the foils were pointed with black to aid the judges. In the United States, the Amateur Fencers League of America drew up a rulebook for fencing in 1891, in Britain the Amateur Gymnastic & Fencing Association drew up an official set of fencing regulations in 1896.

=== Olympic event ===
Only Foil and Sabre events were part of the first Olympic Games in the summer of 1896. Épée was introduced in 1900 (Paris). Foil was omitted from the 1908 (London) Olympics, but since 1912, fencing events for every weapon—Foil, Épée and Sabre—have been held at every Summer Olympics.

Women's foil was first competed at the Olympics in 1924 in Paris. The (so called) 'advanced weapons', Épée and Sabre deemed unsuitable or inappropriate for women, were not included in the Olympic program until late in the 20th century. Women's Épée events were first introduced in 1996 (Atlanta) Olympics and Women's Sabre events in 2000 (Sydney).

In the early years of competition fencing, four judges determined whether a touch had been made. Two side judges stood behind and beside each fencer, watching for hits made by that fencer. A director observed from several metres away. At the end of each action, the director called "Halt," described the action, and then polled the judges. If the judges differed, or abstained, the director could overrule. The Director (also referred to head referee) always has the final say. What he says goes. The only way for a call to be changed is for one of the competitors to ask for a review (protest). If the Director acknowledged his own error, he may change the call.

Though it was universally used, this method had serious limitations, as described by the London newspaper, the Daily Telegraph & Courier, on June 25, 1896:

On Tuesday night, a 10 Warwick Street, Regent Street, the Salle d’Armes of the veteran fencing-master M. Bertrand, an exhibition was given of an exceedingly clever invention. Every one who has watched a bout with the foils knows that the task of judging the hits is with a pair of amateurs difficult enough, and with a well-matched pair of maîtres d’escrime well-nigh impossible... The invention is the work of Mr. Little, the well-known amateur swordsman, and is designed to do away with this uncertainty and useless expenditure of energy. It is hardly necessary to say that the inventor has called electricity to his aid. Briefly, the invention consists of an automatic electric recorder. The instrument is fastened to the wall and connected with the collar of the combatant, from whence the current is conveyed down the sleeve into the handle of the foil. The blade of the foil pressing into the handle completes the connection; the current is conveyed to a bell in the instrument, and thus each hit is recorded. At the exhibition the invention proved an unalloyed success, and ought to be a boon both to competitors and judges—to the former on account of its certainty, and to the latter because it not only lightens their labours, but also frees them from any suspicion of partiality."

There also were problems with bias: well–known fencers were often given the benefit of mistakes (so–called "reputation touches"), and in some cases there was outright cheating. Aldo Nadi complained about this in his autobiography The Living Sword in regard to his famous match with Lucien Gaudin. The Daily Courier article described a new invention, the electrical scoring machine, that would revolutionize fencing.

Starting with épée in 1933, side judges were replaced by the Laurent-Pagan electrical scoring apparatus, with an audible tone and a red or green light indicating when a touch landed. Foil was automated in 1956, sabre in 1988. The scoring box reduced the bias in judging, and permitted more accurate scoring of faster actions, lighter touches, and more touches to the back and flank than before.

== Historical Schools ==
The Venetian school of fencing is a style of fencing that occurred in Venice in the early 12th century, and prevailed until the beginning of the 19th century.

The basics of the Venetian fencing are expounded in the following five treatises:

- Giacomo di Grassi "The Reasons of Victorious Weapon Handling for Attack and Defense" (1570);
- Francesco Alfieri “The Art of Excellent Handling of the Sword” (1653);
- Camillo Agrippa "The Treatise on the Science of Weapons with Philosophical Reflections" (1553);
- Nicoletto Giganti “School or Theater” (1606);
- Salvator Fabris "Fencing or the science of weapons" (1606)

The Venetians were masters of the art, and shared with their colleagues of Bologna the sound principles of fencing known as Bolognese or Venetian. For the first time Venetian fencing was detailed in some directions, it was described the properties of different parts of the blade, which were used in defense and offense. With this approach, the swordsman had an idea of one thing, what now we calling like "center of percussion". It was suggested some divisions of a sword. The blade was divided into four parts, the first two parts from Ephesus should be used for protection; the third one near the center of the blow was used for striking; and the fourth part at the tip was used for pricking.

=== German school of fencing ===
The German school of fencing is a historical combat system, a style of fencing that was widespread in the Holy Roman Empire and existed in the late Middle Ages, Renaissance and early modern times (from the end of XIV to XVII century). This system is characterized by its use of longswords and the teachings of famous fencing masters like Johannes Liechtenauer, whose techniques and principles greatly influenced the martial traditions of the period.

The first document of the German heritage, which describes the methods of fencing, is considered to be the Manuscript I.33 which was written around 1300, which provides detailed instructions on the use of the sword and buckler, laying the groundwork for subsequent fencing manuals and the development of European martial arts.

=== Neapolitan fencing school ===
Neapolitan fencing is a style of fencing that originated in the city of Naples at the beginning of the 15th century. Neapolitan Fencing School is considered to be one of the most powerful fencing schools in Italy. This school produced many renowned fencing masters and contributed significantly to the evolution of fencing techniques and pedagogy. Its influence extended beyond Italy, impacting fencing practices across Europe and shaping the art of swordsmanship during the Renaissance.

=== Mensur ===
Fencing has a long history with universities and schools for at least 500 years. At least one style of fencing, Mensur in Germany, is practiced only within academic fraternities. Mensur is unique in its focus on ritualized dueling, where participants engage in controlled bouts designed to test their courage, endurance, and skill without the intent to harm.

=== Mounted Service School ===
Prior to advances in modern weaponry post World War I, the United States Cavalry taught swordsmanship (mounted and dismounted) in Fort Riley, Kansas at its Mounted Service School. George S. Patton Jr., while still a young lieutenant, was named "Master of the Sword," an honor reserved for the top instructor. He invented what came to be known as the "Patton Saber," in 1913, based on his studies with M. Clery L'Adjutant, reputed to be the finest Fencing Master in Europe at the time. While teaching at Fort Riley, he wrote two training manuals teaching the art of swordsmanship to Army Cavalry Officers, "Saber Exercise 1914" and "Diary of the Instructor in Swordsmanship."

== See also ==
- History of martial arts
- History of physical training and fitness
