= Renaissance Sword Club =

Historical martial arts group

Logo of the Renaissance Sword Club

The Renaissance Sword Club is a historical European martial arts group based in the South East of England. It was founded in 2013 by Rob Runacres. Its primary aim is the research and recreation of European swordsmanship of the sixteenth and seventeenth centuries, specifically those concerned with the rapier and spada da lato, as well as their companion weapons such as the dagger, cloak, buckler and rotella. Members have also pursued interests outside of the core curriculum in to staff weapons, longsword and small sword.

== Curriculum ==
Students follow the theories and methods of the Italian and French schools of fencing as laid down by martial arts manuals of fencing instructors such as Achille Marozzo, Charles Besnard, Giovanni dall’Agocchie and François Dancie. Though sidesword and rapier are considered as different sword forms for teaching purposes, emphasis is placed on the similarities in mechanics and theory. Lessons are instructor led with sparring elements.

Members are encouraged to enter competitions and have attended events such as Longpoint, Swordfish, The Albion Cup, The Wessex League and others.

== History ==
The Renaissance Sword Club was founded in 2013 by Rob Runacres, formerly an instructor at the School of the Sword.

== Educational provision ==
Members of the club lecture and provide workshops across Europe. Much of this has centred on the research on sword fighting in Early Modern France. Major work has concentrated on the anonymous 'Book of Lessons', Charles Besnard's 'Le maistre d’arme liberal', Girolamo Cavalcabo's Treaty or Instruction for Fencing' and 'The Sword of Combat' by Francois Dancie.

== Research ==
Rob Runacres received his PhD from the University of Winchester in the UK in 2024. He specialises in researching fencing masters and martial instruction in the sixteenth and seventeenth centuries as well as related topics in family history and court studies.

== Publications ==
- Charles Besnard (translated by Rob Runacres and Anne Chauvat). The Free Master of Arms. Fallen Rook, 2022. ISBN 978-1-913066-02-4
- Pedro De Heredia (translated by Rob Runacres). Book of Lessons. Fallen Rook, 2017. ISBN 978-0-9934216-5-5
- Francois Dancie (translated by Rob Runacres and Thibault Ghesquiere). The Sword of Combat or The Use of Fighting With Weapons. Lulu.com, 2014. ISBN 978-1-29191-969-1
- Girolamo Cavalcabo (translated by Rob Runacres). Treaty or Instruction for Fencing. ISBN 978-1-326-16469-0
- Rob Runacres. "The Bolognese Tradition: Ancient Tradition or Modern Myth?". Acta Periodica Duellatorum 10(1): 1-18. doi:10.36950/apd-2022-002

== See also ==
- Rapier
- Swordsmanship
- French school of fencing
- Italian school of swordsmanship
- Historical European martial arts
