= French school of fencing =

Fencing school

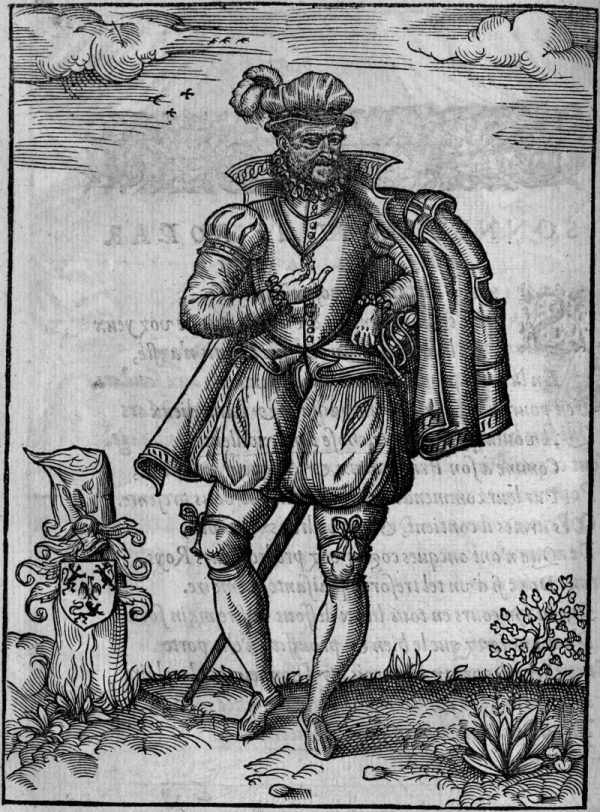
- Henry de Saint-Didier
- Also known as: L'école française d'escrime
- Focus: Weaponry
- Country of origin: France
- Creator: Henry de Saint-Didier
- Ancestor arts: Italian school of swordsmanship
- Descendant arts: Modern fencing, Canne de combat, HEMA
- Olympic sport: No

The known history of fencing in France begins in the 16th century, with the adoption of Italian styles of fencing.

There are medieval predecessors, such as the Burgundian Le jeu de la hache ("The Play of the Axe") of ca. 1400, but the history of the classical French school begins with the foundation of the Académie des Maistres en faits d’armes de l’Académie du Roy (also known as the École française d’Escrime) by Charles IX of France in December 1567.

One master produced by this school was Henry de Saint-Didier, author of a 1573 treatise titled Traicté contenant les secrets du premier livre sur l'espee seule (Treatise containing the secrets of the first book on the single sword), dedicated to Charles IX.

Rapier treatises are known from the early seventeenth century, such as François Dancie's Discours des armes et methode pour bien tirer de l'espée et poignard (c.1610) and L'espée de combat (1623) and André Desbordes' Discours de la théorie et de la pratique de l'excellence des armes (1610), with both authors citing the Italian origins of their systems. Earlier, in 1597, the great traveller Seigneur de Villamont translated Girolamo Cavalcabo of Bologna's treatise into French, along with a shorter piece by Paternostrier of Rome.

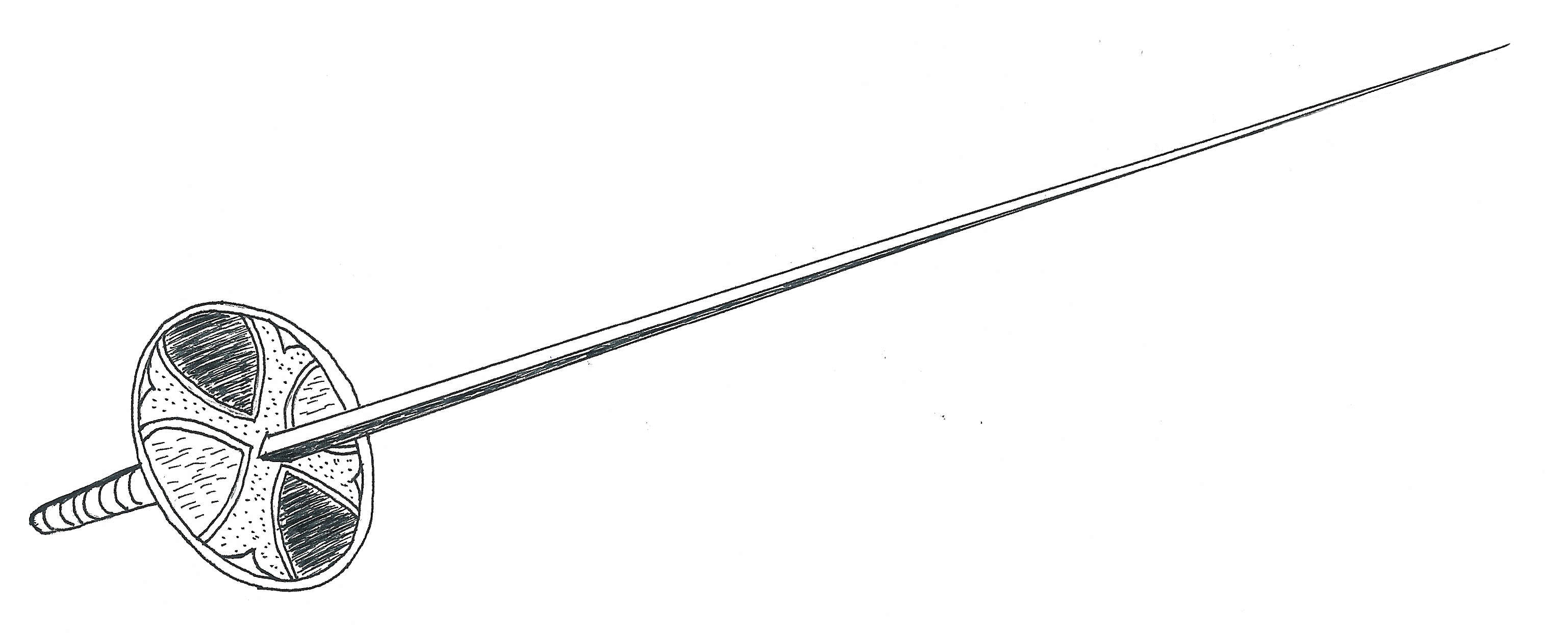
Pariser small sword, derived from the French foil

Fencing in France was developed into a sport during the 17th century, with codification of rules and terminology and a system of teaching. Cesar Cavalcabo from Italy and son of Italian fencing master Hieronymus was invited to teach the great fencing tradition of Bologna to the future Louis XIII, and has influenced the development of French swordplay in the early seventeenth century. Also, the art of fencing in France was taught by local masters such as Le Perche du Coudray (1635, 1676, teacher of Cyrano de Bergerac), Besnard (1653, teacher of Descartes), Philibert de la Touche (1670) and L'Abbat of Toulouse (1690, 1696).

The modern foil was developed in France as a training technique in the middle of the 18th century; it provided practice of fast and elegant thrust fencing with a smaller and safer weapon than an actual dueling sword. Fencers blunted (or "foiled") its point by wrapping a foil around the blade or fastening a knob on the point (fleuret, "blossom"). German students took up that practice and developed the Pariser ("Parisian") thrusting small sword for their academic fencing bouts.

By the 18th century, the French school had become the western European standard to the extent, that Domenico Angelo, an Italian-born master teaching in England, published his L'école des Armes in French in 1763. It was extremely successful and became a standard fencing manual over the following 50 years, throughout the Napoleonic period. Angelo's text was so influential that it was chosen to be included under the heading of "Éscrime" in Diderot's Encyclopédie.

The emergence of classical sports fencing in the 19th century was a direct continuation of the French tradition.

== Bibliography ==
- Hieronymus Calvacabo of Bologna and Patenostrier of Rome, Treatise or Instruction for Fencing, trans. Rob Runacres, Lulu.com (2015), ISBN 978-1-326-16469-0
- Francois Dancie, The Sword of Combat or The Use of Fighting With Weapons, trans. Rob Runacres and Thibault Ghesquiere, Lulu.com (2014), ISBN 978-1-29191-969-1.
- Sainct Didier, La Bibliothèque de feu Edouard Rahir, Paris, 1931, n° 662; facsimile reprint, Paris, 1907.
- Pedro De Heredia (translated by Rob Runacres). Book of Lessons. Fallen Rook, 2017. ISBN 978-0-9934216-5-5
- Domenico Angelo, The School of Fencing: With a General Explanation of the Principal Attitudes and Positions Peculiar to the Art, eds. Jared Kirby and Jak P. Mallmann Showell, Greenhill Books (2005), ISBN 978-1-85367-626-0.
- Pascal Brioist, Hervé Drévillon, Pierre Serna, Croiser le fer: violence et culture de l'épée dans la France moderne, XVIe-XVIIIe siècle, Editions Champ Vallon, 2002, ISBN 978-2-87673-352-7.

== See also ==
- Classical fencing
- Rapier
- Swordsmanship
- Italian school of swordsmanship
- Historical European martial arts
