= Jared Kirby (fencing) =

Jared Kirby is a classical and historical fencing master who earned the rank of Master of Arms (Maestro d'Armi) through the Martinez Academy of Arms and continues to study fencing under Maestro Ramon Martinez in New York City. Ramon Martinez who is one of the last fencing masters to teach fencing as a martial art. Jared also teaches Combat for Screen & Stage and is a certified fight director with the Art of Combat.

Jared Kirby first became involved in Western Martial Arts and Combat for Stage & Screen in 1995. Beginning his studies of historical fencing in Minneapolis, Minnesota, Mr. Kirby moved to Scotland in order to study with Maestro Paul Macdonald. He then moved to New York in 1999 to study at the Martinez Academy. In December 2003 he earned his first instructor ranks and continued until becoming Provost of Arms in November 2013 and a Master of Arms in November 2016.

Jared is a member of Actor’s Equity and SAG/AFTRA. As a Stunt Performer he has worked on movies like IF_(film) (starring Ryan_Reynolds) and Confess,_Fletch (starring Jon_Hamm) and TV shows like Law & Order: Organized Crime, The Gilded Age (TV_series), Bull (2016 TV series), The Equalizer (2021 TV_series), Dickinson (TV_series), Lisey's Story (TV_series), Prodigal Son (TV_series), Blue Bloods (TV_series), City on a Hill (TV_series), and Gotham (TV_series).

As a fight coordinator he has worked on many shows in New York City, Regionally, in London and Australia. Jared has worked with stars such as Peter Sarsgaard, Steve Guttenberg, Cameron_Douglas and has trained performers who are working on hit shows. Jared is the Head of New York Combat for Stage & Screen in New York City. and teaches at the prestigious Tom Todoroff Conservatory as well as the NY Conservatory for Dramatic Arts.

Kirby is the editor and one of the translators of "Italian Rapier Combat", the first complete, professional translation of Ridolfo Capo Ferro. He is also the editor and wrote the introduction for "The School of Fencing" by Domenico Angelo and annotated by Maestro Jeannette Acosta-Martínez. His third book "A Gentleman's Guide to Duelling" is a republication of Vincentio Saviolo's 2nd book "Of Honor and Honourable Quarrels" updated to modern British English, and includes a biography of Saviolo. In 2017 Kirby published a reprint of Donald McBane's "The Expert Swordsman’s Companion" with an introduction by Ben Miller. In 2021 his newest book co-authored with Seth Duerr, "Staging Shakespeare's Violence" was released. Additionally in 2021 the 2nd edition of "Italian Rapier Combat" was released as well.

He teaches fencing and personal defense at SUNY Purchase, Sarah Lawrence College, The Tom Todoroff Conservatory and at the Leonia Rec Dept.

He teaches a variety of workshops across the US and around the world including Canada, England, Scotland, Finland, Italy and Australia. He has taught at the Paddy Crean International Art of the Sword Workshop, CombatCon in Las Vegas, the NYCSS Summer Intensive, the International Sword fighting and Martial Arts Convention (ISMAC), Rapier Camp and the Western Washington WMA Workshop amongst many others.

He is the President of CombatCon in Las Vegas, an annual event that brings together sword enthusiasts from around the world.
