= Laurentius Guild =

Danish historical European martial arts group

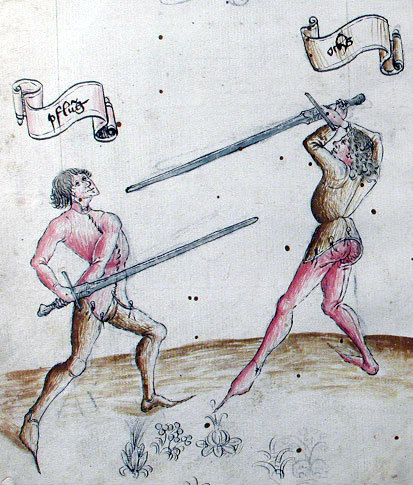
Longsword guards (1452 manuscript)

Laurentius Guild (Laurentiusgildet) is a historical European martial arts group headquartered in Aarhus, Denmark with chapters in Nyborg and Vordingborg. Its membership consists of academic researchers specializing in fencing with a focus on the 14th and 15th centuries.

== Description ==
Led by Frede Jensen of Randers Museum, the group provides organized instruction in the study and practice of historical European swordplay with a particular focus on longsword fencing, with or without armour, and on sword and buckler fencing. It is one of several northern European groups of students and researchers in the area of medieval martial arts. Established in 2004, it is a small historical European martial arts group whose members are mainly from Aarhus University, especially those specializing in medieval archaeology or history.

The Nyborg chapter specialises in longsword, rapier, and poleaxe. Indeed, longsword interpretation across the Guild is led by Claus Sørensen, a medieval archeologist based in Nyborg Castle. Methodology is based on fencing manuscripts from the 14th to 17th centuries with a focus on the 14th and 15th centuries. This is enhanced with the practical knowledge gained through solo and partnered drilling, and free play (sparring). In this way, it follows a similar methodology to experimental archeology.

The Laurentius Guild is part of HEMAC (Historical European Martial Arts Coalition), which is a pan-European organization of martial artists and researchers dedicated to the study of traditional European fighting arts and martial traditions.

== See also ==
- Fiore dei Liberi
- Johannes Liechtenauer
- Swordsmanship
- German school of swordsmanship
- Italian school of swordsmanship
- Historical European martial arts
- Association for Renaissance Martial Arts
