= Arne Koets =

Practitioner of historical martial arts

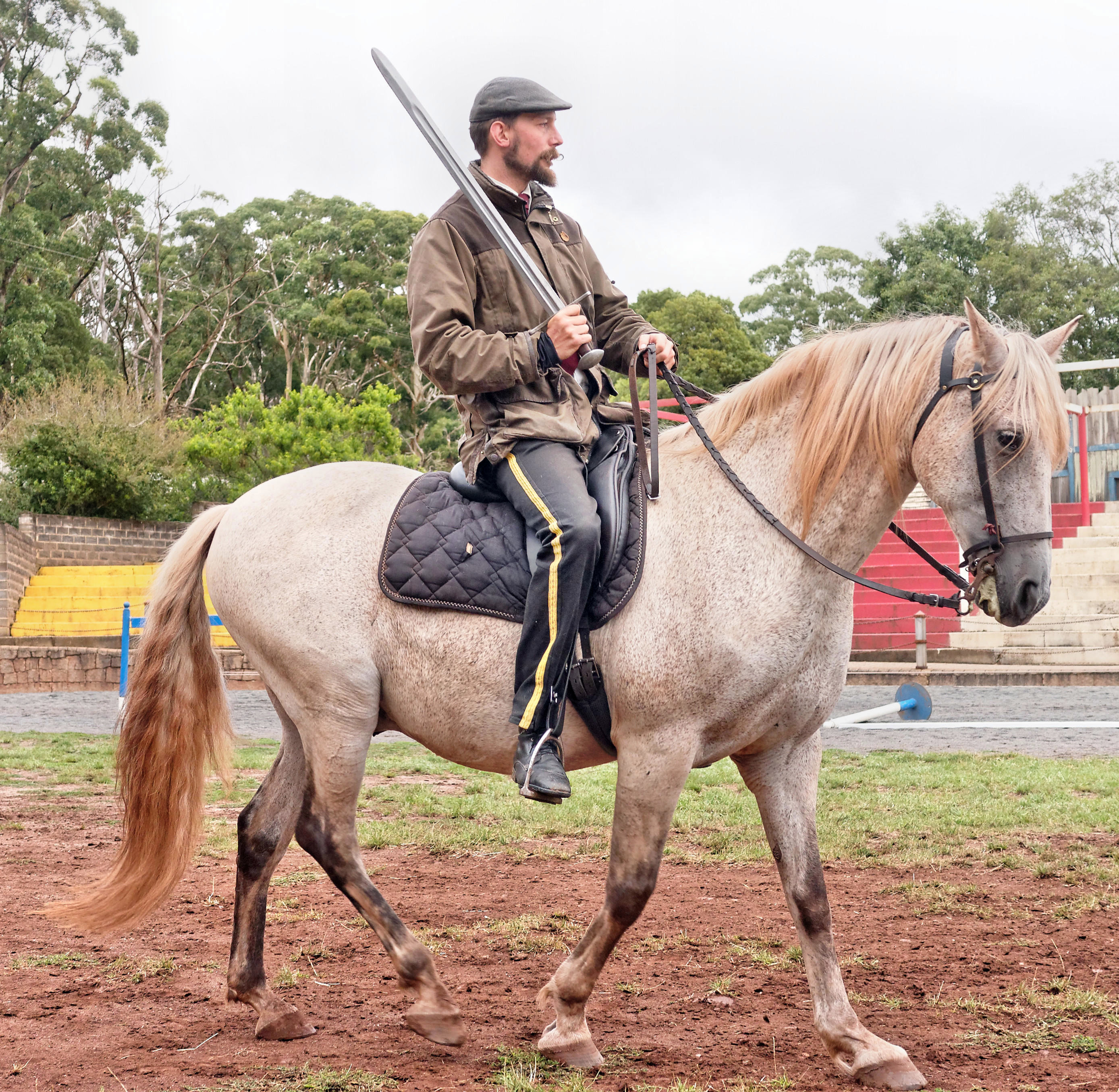
Arne Koets at Kryal Castle in Ballarat in 2017.

Arne Koets is a historical European martial arts (HEMA) practitioner and instructor from the Netherlands. Along with Guy Windsor in Finland, he is one of the few people that works as a full-time professional instructor in HEMA. He is a notable figure in the world of HEMA, being an expert in jousting and historical dressage. He runs seminars internationally. Koets has ridden in more than 400 tournaments, in ten countries, on three continents.

Koets was involved in one of the first groups to begin HEMA in the Netherlands. He started to reconstruct fencing books in 1998. He enrolled at the University of Amsterdam to study archaeology and there initially started sword combat with a historical martial arts group. It was at the University that he originally began to ride. His advanced education in historical riding art happened in the Princely Riding School at Bueckeburg castle, where he worked as curator in the horse museum from 2010 to 2014. His mentor riding master Wolfgang Krischke took care of the training and equipped Koets with the best educated riding art stallions of the school. In 2012 Koets participated at the reenactment of the Carrousel de Sanssouci, a mounted fest that originally took place 1750 in Potsdam under Frederik II of Prussia.

Koets is one of the main figures in international historical mounted combat jousting, he has been responsible for TV events, writing articles and is responsible for organising hundreds of tournaments in his time, including The Grand Tournament at Schaffhausen and The Grand Tournament of Sankt Wendel and The Tournament of the Golden Chain at Middelaldercentret in Denmark.

In his past, he has worked at many institutions in the historical military context, including the Royal Armouries in Leeds, the Royal Netherlands Army Museum and Fürstliche Hofreitschule in Bückeburg. Koets was one of the founding members of the Stichting Historisch Educatief Initiatief, a Dutch foundation promoting education through living history.

Once a year he runs the Harnischfechten and Roßfechten (Note: "armoured combat" and "mounted combat") Symposium in his garden.
