= Alfred Hutton =

British Army officer, antiquarian and writer (1839–1910)

External images
- Alfred Hutton's grave (a big cross with a bouquet of flowers)
- Part of the grave's inscription
- Hutton's armorial crest

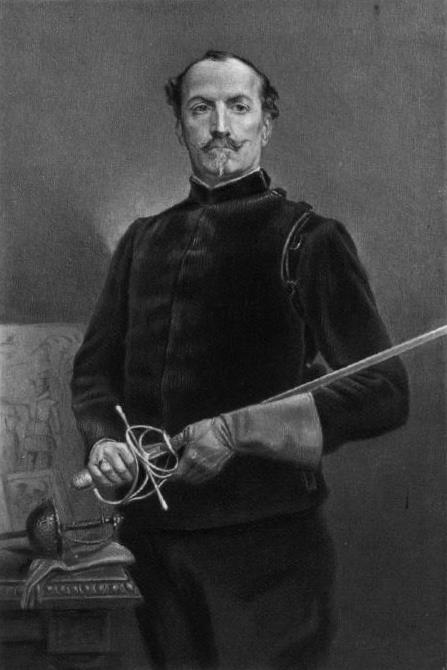
Illustration of Alfred Hutton

Alfred Hutton FSA (10 March 1839 – 18 December 1910) was a British Army officer, antiquarian and writer. Serving during the Victorian era in the 1st King's Dragoon Guards, he played a major role in the revival of historical fencing in England, together with fellow fencers Egerton Castle, Ernest Stenson-Cooke, Sir Frederick Pollock and Walter Herries Pollock.

== Early life ==
Alfred Hutton was born on 10 March 1839 at Beverley, Yorkshire the eleventh and youngest child and seventh son of Henry William Hutton (1787–1848) and his wife Marianne (before 1795–1879), only child of John Fleming of Beverley. Henry W Hutton was a captain in the 4th Royal Irish Dragoon Guards, retired 1811.

Alfred attended Blackheath Proprietary School (Lewisham), matriculated at University College, Oxford, on 25 November 1857. He was intended for the Church, but the outbreak of the Indian Mutiny in 1857 turned his thoughts toward a military career, and he left the university without graduating and joined the Army.

== Military career ==
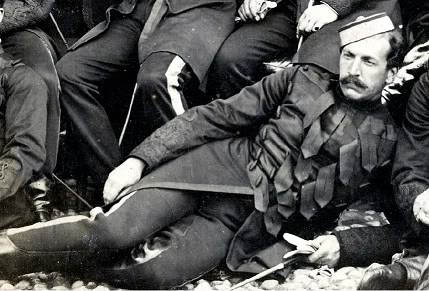
In stable dress, wearing a forage cap

His military career began on 31 May 1859, when he joined the 79th (Cameron) Highlanders as an Ensign. On arrival at the depot of his regiment at Perth he soon proved himself an expert fencer.

The youngest officer was probably the most skilful swordsman in the Army, though his comrades did not realise the fact. He brought with him a bundle of swords of different kinds, and one of the sergeants, anxious to teach the newcomer a lesson, challenged him to a bout. The sergeant, who had a reputation as a man-at-arms, chose the bayonet against the young ensign's sword, but was easily worsted, and the result was the same when the weapons were changed. After this feat the young officer was invited to form a fencing class for the officers and non-commissioned officers, and the swordsmanship of the regiment was greatly improved.

Upon joining the headquarters of his regiment in India, at the request of his commanding officer, Colonel Hodgson, he organized in the regiment the Cameron Fencing Club, for which he prepared his first work, a 12-page booklet entitled Swordsmanship (1862), printed at Simla Advertiser Press. On 14 January 1862 Hutton was promoted to the rank of Lieutenant. In 1864 after 4 years in the infantry he exchanged into the cavalry: the 7th Hussars. After being invalided home in 1865 he joined the 1st King's Dragoon Guards in 1866, and continued to popularize fencing in his regiments. He was gazetted captain on 30 September 1868, and retired from the service in 1873.

Throughout his career he was a strong advocate of better swordsmanship in the Army. He was one of the first, too, to raise bayonet fighting to the dignity of a science.

== Fencing ==
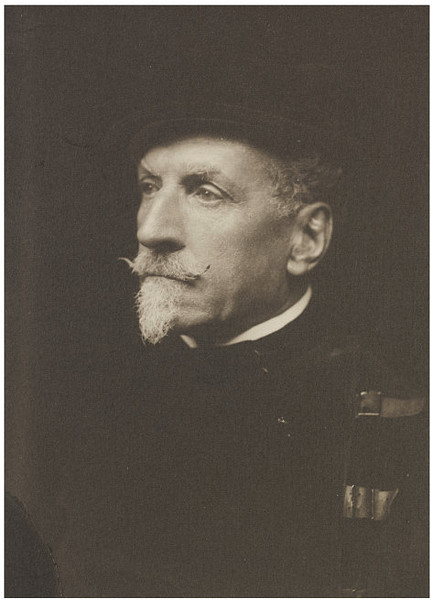
Portrait of Alfred Hutton (late 1890s)

Hutton started to learn fencing at the age of twelve at the fencing school in St James' Street from Henry Charles Angelo the Younger (1780–1852), appointed Superintendent of Sword Exercise in the Army (1833–1852), author of Infantry Sword Exercise (1845), which remained the standard Army reference book for sword instruction on foot for 50 years. This school was established by Domenico Angelo Malevolti Tremamondo (1716–1802), renowned Italian fencing master from Leghorn, author of the classic treatise on small sword L’École des armes (1763, The School of Fencing). Alfred's father was a pupil of Henry Angelo the elder (1756–1835), son of the founder of this fencing dynasty, Domenico Angelo.

After returning from India in 1865, Hutton had become the pupil and friend of William McTurk, Henry Charles Angelo's successor at the school of arms in St James' Street. On leaving the army he focused on practicing modern fencing with foil, sabre, and bayonet, but mainly on the study and revival of older fencing systems and schools. In 1889 Hutton published his most influential work, Cold Steel: A Practical Treatise on the Sabre, which presented an original method of military sabre use on foot, combining the 18th century English backsword with modern Italian duelling sabre. The treatise also offered self-defense techniques based on constable's truncheon and short sword-bayonet, as well as exercise material from 16th century texts, including Marozzo. He successfully advocated the use by cavalry of a straight pointed sword for thrusting rather than an edged sword for cutting. In 1890 he published Fixed Bayonets, in which he insisted that a competently wielded bayonet should beat a good swordsman, but his views of bayonet fighting were regarded in the army as too theoretical for modern practical instruction. He retorted by deploring military reliance on Italian theories of swordsmanship to the exclusion of effective French practice.

Hutton's pioneering advocacy and practice of historical fencing included reconstructions of the fencing systems of several historical masters including George Silver and Achille Marozzo. He delivered numerous lectures on, and practical demonstrations of these systems during the 1890s, both in order to benefit various military charities and to encourage patronage of the contemporary methods of competitive fencing, which had hitherto fallen out of popular fashion in England. He also used these lectures and demonstrations to advocate his own theories about military sabre fencing.

== Influence upon stage fencing ==
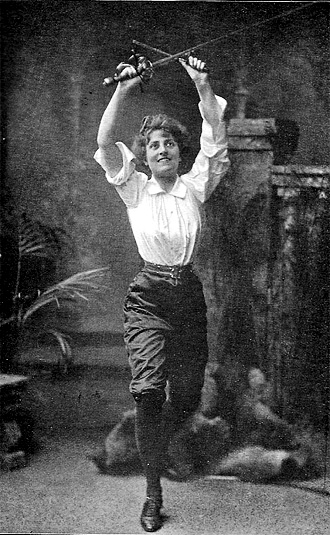
Actress and stage fencer Esmé Beringer, a student of Hutton's.

Hutton successfully introduced realistic, historically accurate swordplay into the contemporary theatrical repertoire. In Old Sword Play (1892) he wrote:

There are those who affect to ridicule the study of obsolete weapons, alleging that it is of no practical use; everything, however, is useful to the Art of Fence which tends to create an interest in it, and certain it is that such contests as Rapier and Dagger, Two hand Sword, or Broadsword and Handbuckler, are a very great embellishment to the somewhat monotonous proceedings of the ordinary assault of arms.

The Combinations will be found extremely useful as forms of "set play" for combats on the dramatic stage.

Circa 1899–1902, Hutton taught stage fencing classes for actors via the Bartitsu Club, where he also served on the board of directors and learned the basics of jujutsu and the Vigny method of stick fighting from his fellow instructors.

Alfred Hutton arranged combats for numerous London plays, including:

- Romeo and Juliet at the Court Theatre, performed 17 March 1904 – 5 March 1904
- The Comedy of Errors, performed 17 December 1904 (4 performances)
- Romeo and Juliet at the Lyceum, performed 14 March 1908 – 30 May 1908

== Death ==
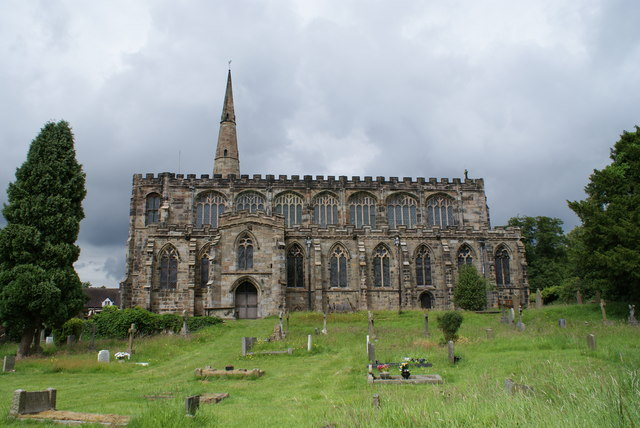
St Mary's Church from the south

He died unmarried at his chambers in 76 Jermyn Street, London, on 18 December 1910, and was buried in the churchyard of St Mary's Church in Astbury, near Congleton, Cheshire, three days later. The following inscription can be found on his grave:

In Affectionate Memory of / ALFRED HUTTON late King's Dragoon Guards & Last Surviving Son of HENRY WILLIAM HUTTON of Beverley / Hold thou Thy Cross Before My Closing Eyes / Born March 10th 1839. Died December 18th 1910, Aged 71 Years.

On 8 October 1911 a memorial tablet - In Memoriam Captain Alfred Hutton Late The King's Dragoon Guards Born March 10, 1839 Died December 18, 1910. A Great Swordsman And Writer On The Art. RIP. - was unveiled in the chancel of St Mary's Church (Astbury) by Lieutenant General Sir Edward Hutton, his nephew.

Several works of Alfred Hutton have been republished in the past decade: Old sword play: techniques of the great masters (2001, 2010), The sword through the centuries (2002) (original title: The Sword and the Centuries or Old Sword Days and Old Sword Ways), Cold steel: the art of fencing with the sabre (2006).

== Family ==
His mother, Marianne (died 19 January 1879, aged 87) and two sisters: Harriott (died 18 January 1906) and Marianne Eleanor (died 31 January 1908, aged 95) were also buried in the churchyard of St Mary's Church. One of his brothers, Henry John died in 1846 and was buried in the Beverly Cathedral, a memorial tablet:

Here lies the remains of Henry John Hutton, the beloved son of Henry William and Marianne Hutton, formerly Captain in her Majesty's 34th Regiment. He was born at Sherwood Hall in Nottinghamshire 1 July 1814 and died at Clifton near Bristol 24 October 1846

can be found there.

His other brother, Edward Thomas Hutton (died 1849), was the father of Sir Edward Hutton KCMG.

== Collections ==
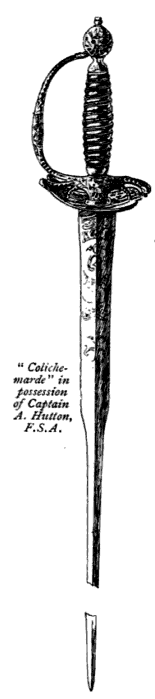
A colichemarde from the Hutton's collection

Hutton bequeathed his fine collection of fencing and duelling literature, with some admirable specimens of oriental sword-cutlery, to the Victoria and Albert Museum. 371 books from his collection of fencing books - Hutton Bequest - can be found in the National Art Library in the V&A Museum. Most volumes bound for Hutton are in vellum, with red leather lettering pieces on the upper covers and backs. Upper covers are gold blocked with Hutton's name in Gothic type and his armorial crest.

Further collections of books formerly owned by him are the Corble Collection, located at the Universiteitsbibliotheek at the Katholieke Universiteit Leuven, and the Emil Fick Library, located at the Livrustkammaren (Sweden).

== Commemorations ==
In May 2013 the Forteza Western martial arts studio in Chicago commemorated Hutton via the dedication of the Captain Alfred Hutton Lounge, incorporating a library, research center, museum of historical swords and weapons, art gallery of 19th century fencing prints and a social space.

== Works ==
- Swordsmanship (1862), written for the members of the Cameron Fencing Club (Simla)
- Swordsmanship, for the use of soldiers (1866)
- Swordsmanship and Bayonet-fencing (1867)
- The Cavalry Swordsman (1867)
- Bayonet-fencing and Sword-practice (1882)
- Cold Steel: a practical treatise on the sabre, based on the old English backsword play of the Eighteenth century, combined with the method of the modern Italian school. Also on various other weapons of the present day, including the short sword-bayonet and the constable’s truncheon. Illustrated with numerous figures, and also with reproductions of engravings from masters of bygone years (1889)
- Our Daggers: or, how to use the new bayonet (1890)
- Fixed Bayonets. A complete system of fence for the British magazine rifle, explaining the uses of the point, edges, and butt, both in offence and defence: comprising also a glossary of English, French, and Italian terms common to the art of fencing, with a bibliographical list of works affecting the bayonet (1890)
- The Swordsman. A manual of fence for the three arms, foil, sabre, and bayonet. With an appendix consisting of a code of rules for assaults, competitions (1891)
- Old Swordplay: A glance at the systems of fence in vogue during the XVIth, XVIIth, and XVIIIth centuries, with lessons arranged from the works of various ancient masters for the practical study of the use of the picturesque arms borne of forefathers (1892)
- Our Swordsmanship (1893), lecture at the Royal United Service Institution, Whitehall
- Notes on Ancient Fence (1895), a descriptive account of the 16th-century swordplay, at the Albany Club (Kingston upon Thames), by members of the school of arms, London Rifle Brigade under the direction of Captain Alfred Hutton, FSA and Ernest Stenson Cooke, Esq. With notes on 'Ancient fence' by Captain A Hutton and on the bibliography of the art of fence, by Captain C A Thimm, FRGS
- The infantry sword exercises of 1895 (c. 1895)
- A criticism of the infantry sword exercise of 1895 (1896)
- Sword Fighting and Sword Play (1897), The Indian Fencing Review
- The Swordsman. A manual of fence for the foil, sabre and bayonet (1898)
- Examples of Ju Jitsu, or Japanese Wrestling for Schoolboys (undated, around 1900) Ju jitsu
- The Sword and the Centuries or Old Sword Days and Old Sword Ways: being a description of the various swords used in civilized Europe during the last five centuries, and of single combats which have been fought with them (1901)

== See also ==
- George Silver
- Bolognese Swordsmanship
- HEMA
- Schola Gladiatoria
