= Ragione di adoprar sicuramente l'Arme, si da offesa come da difesa =

1570 fencing treatise by Giacomo di Grassi

The Ragione di adoprar sicuramente l'Arme, si da offesa come da difesa was a famous treatise on fencing published by Giacomo di Grassi in 1570. The text was later translated into English and published again in 1594, as Di Grassi, His True Arte of Defence. The translation of Di Grassi was one of the three premiere fencing texts known from Elizabethan England.

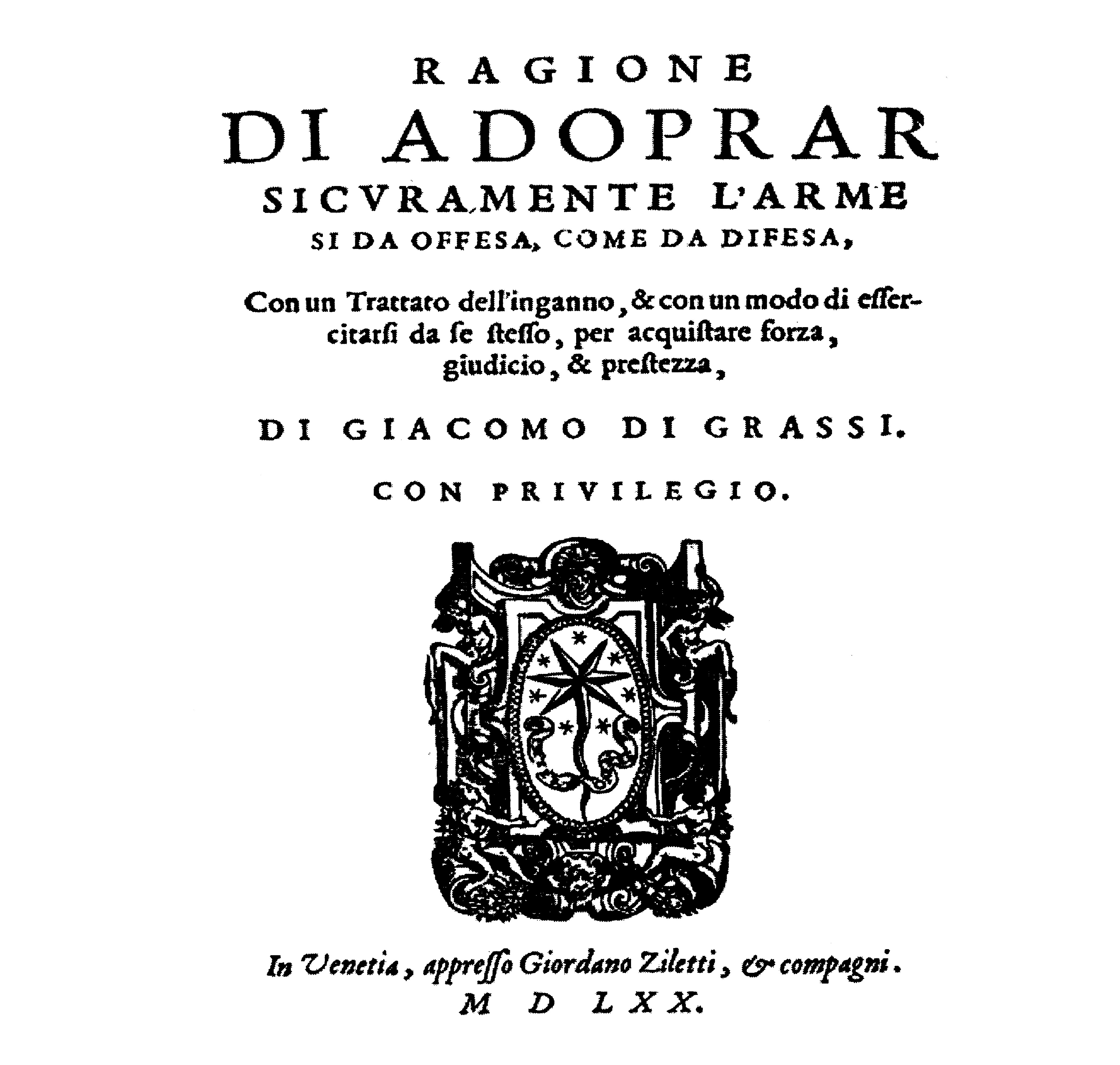
Giacomo di Grassi. Ragione di adoprar sicuramente l'Arme, si da offesa come da difesa

The main teachings of the book were that weapons of the same length are used similarly, the thrust is preferred to all other attacks, as well as specifics on how to thrust and handle specific weapons.

== Introduction ==
Di Grassi wrote at a time of transition from heavier swords to longer lighter swords such as the rapier. The illustrated posture and footwork style is erect, front facing, with feet close together; similar to modern Kendo footwork but unlike that advocated by some 17th-century authors of the subsequent generation.

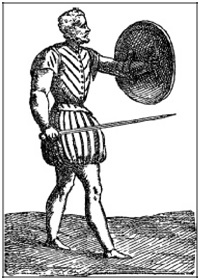
Sword and shield from the treatise of Giacomo di Grassi "Ragione di adoprar sicuramente l'Arme, si da offesa come da difesa"

=== Weapons of the same length are used similarly ===
Swords and spears, when used to fight at close quarters, both work on the same principles. They are bladed weapons, with handles of varying lengths. What is important to keep in mind when using these is their length. There are three lengths, which determine how they are held and used: short, medium and long. Short, like a single-handed sword, means about half the height of the user. Medium, like a two-handed sword or a short spear, means about the height of the user. Long, like a pike, means significantly taller than the user.

=== The thrust to be preferred to all other attacks ===
For all weapons, the straight thrust forward is the quickest method of attack, puts the least amount of stress on the weapon of any blow, and if the tip is pointed, provides the easiest method of piercing into the body.

=== How to thrust ===
To thrust it forward, the weapon must be jabbed ahead, with the arms alone, a step forward, a lunge-step, a jump, a run, or any combination or stringing together of these.

To get maximum reach and to make the body as flat as possible to the opponent to dodge a counter-thrust, at the end of the thrust the back foot is shifted diagonally forward so that it is in line with the front foot and the tip of the weapon. The final diagonal step also brings the body out of the direct forward thrust path of the opponent, achieving an angular attack and evasion both at once.

== Ideal movements ==
The following three actions can be practised as drills in basic ancient weapon handling, if you are healthy enough to try them, if you have enough space to safely perform them, and if you have sticks of varying lengths to use.

=== The sword ===
For a short weapon (a single-handed sword), assuming a right-handed fighter, the weapon is held in the right hand, with the hand somewhere to the outside of the right hip, and the point directed at somewhere around the opponent’s heart or throat. The right foot is placed forward. This position gives maximum protection while providing maximum offensive capability also. When the sword is thrust forward by the right hand, so too is the right foot, and the left foot is brought up to be in line with them. Because the weapon is so short and manoeuvrable, the angularity of the final lining up may be hardly noticeable, nor quite as important as with the longer weapons. To finish, the entire sequence can be run in reverse to return everything to its initial position.

=== The spear or two-handed sword ===
For a medium weapon (a short spear, a bayoneted gun or a two-handed sword), requiring two hands, the left hand grabs near the buttstock and the right a comfortable distance ahead of it, about one foot up to give an estimation. The left hand is either squarely in front of the lower belly, or it is closer to the left hip, depending on how long the weapon is compared to the user’s height. The point is comfortably stretched out towards the opponent’s neck or upper chest. The stance is more square than for the short weapon, although the right foot is still forward somewhat. To thrust, the right and left hands both push forward together, but the right hand then releases its grip to allow the left to keep pushing the weapon out to its fullest extent. At the same time, the left foot is brought from behind to step far forward in front of the right foot, and finally, the right foot is shifted forward and to the left to align it with the point of the weapon and the left foot. The left hand must then pull the weapon back so that the right hand can grab it and return to the on-guard position described above. The feet go through a reverse pattern of what they just did to return the body to its initial position. This is a more complex movement than with the short weapon, and so takes more drill to become comfortable with.

=== The pike ===
For a long weapon, such as a pike, the hands are placed well apart, with the right this time at or near the butt end of the weapon, and is placed well back of the hip, and the left hand stretched out toward the opponent. The switched places of the hands from the previous weapon are because the right hand (the dominant and more dextrous hand) has more control of the movements of the long weapon when at the back than at the front, due to the added length and weight of the weapon and also because there is more leverage to be applied from behind than from in front now. In this case, the pivot point is the left hand. In the case of the previous, medium, weapon, the pivot point in the manipulation of the spear or sword is really somewhere between the two hands, but closer to the forward, right, hand. The stance with the long weapon is with the left foot now in front, with the right foot behind. So, to thrust the long weapon forward, both hands are used initially, as in the last weapon, and the left hand is then released to allow the point to pass as far forwards as possible. The right leg is brought up to step far in front of the left, and the left is brought into alignment with the right foot and the point. Then, the right pulls back on the weapon, allowing the left to re-grip. The feet can be put through a reverse of what they have just done to return to the on-guard position.

== The use of less perfect motions ==
Thinking of these thrusts as the most direct, quickest, and most reaching ways to attack the opponent, one can start to imagine all of the less efficient cutting, hitting and chopping attacks possible also, employed to catch the opponent off guard. The first would be the delivery of a straight-down blow from above, using the same stepping patterns to achieve maximum reach.

== General tactics ==
For defensive and offensive manoeuvres for a superior position, various beats, parries, blocks, slaps, dodges, steps and jumps to stay out of range or spring into range are employed. Once a superior striking position is achieved, the fighter will thrust or strike home and finish the fight.

== The shield ==
When used in conjunction with another weapon, the shield, of various shapes and sizes, each requiring their own specific uses, was held in the left hand and the weapon in the right hand. This usually necessitated that weapons of the short variety be used since medium and long ones would be too heavy for the right hand alone to wield. The right foot was placed forward and the left foot behind, which although more straining a position than the other way around, kept the right hand in a better place for thrusting, and the left, unarmed side, farther away from the opponent. The shield was held outstretched towards the opponent's face to limit his vision and to parry his weapon closer to its pivot point where it is weakest in its movement.

== See also ==
- Dardi School
