= Girolamo Cavalcabo =

Bolognese fencing master

Girolamo Cavalcabo (known in France as 'Hieronyme' or 'Hieronymus') was a Bolognese fencing master, teaching in Rome and later Paris in the late sixteenth and early seventeenth centuries.

== Biography ==
Egerton Castle suggests that his father was Zacharia Cavalcabo, who published Angelo Viggiani’s treatise in 1567; indeed, Castle believes that Viggiani was Hieronyme’s fencing master, though he gives no citation for this claim. At some point, Girolamo travelled to Rome, where he perhaps first came into contact by the ‘Agrippan’ system of guards; Brantôme in his memoirs mentions a "Hiéronime" teaching in Rome.

In 1597, Seigneur de Villamont translated Cavalcabo’s manuscript 'Treaty or Instruction for Fencing' into French. Possibly because of this, Cavalcabo was appointed to the court of Henry IV of France to teach the Dauphin (later Louis XIII) and his brother Gaston D’Orleans; his son, César, was Master of Arms to the French Court until 1642. Girolamo Cavalcabo is mentioned in the diary of Jean Héroard, the Dauphin's personal physician, including receiving a blow from his pupil, while adjusting the boy's foot.

Much of Girolamo's text can be found in the first section of 'Livre Des Leçons', a seventeenth century manuscript attributed to Pedro De Heredia, a Spanish governor of Brussels.

== Bibliography ==
- Hieronymus Calvacabo of Bologna and Patenostrier of Rome, Treatise or Instruction for Fencing, trans. Rob Runacres, Lulu.com (2015), ISBN 978-1-326-16469-0
- Rob Runacres, The Book of Lessons; The Historical Fencing Treatise Attributed to Pedro De Heredia, Fallen Rook (2018), ISBN 978-0-9934216-5-5
