= Vincentio Saviolo =

Italian author on fencing in English

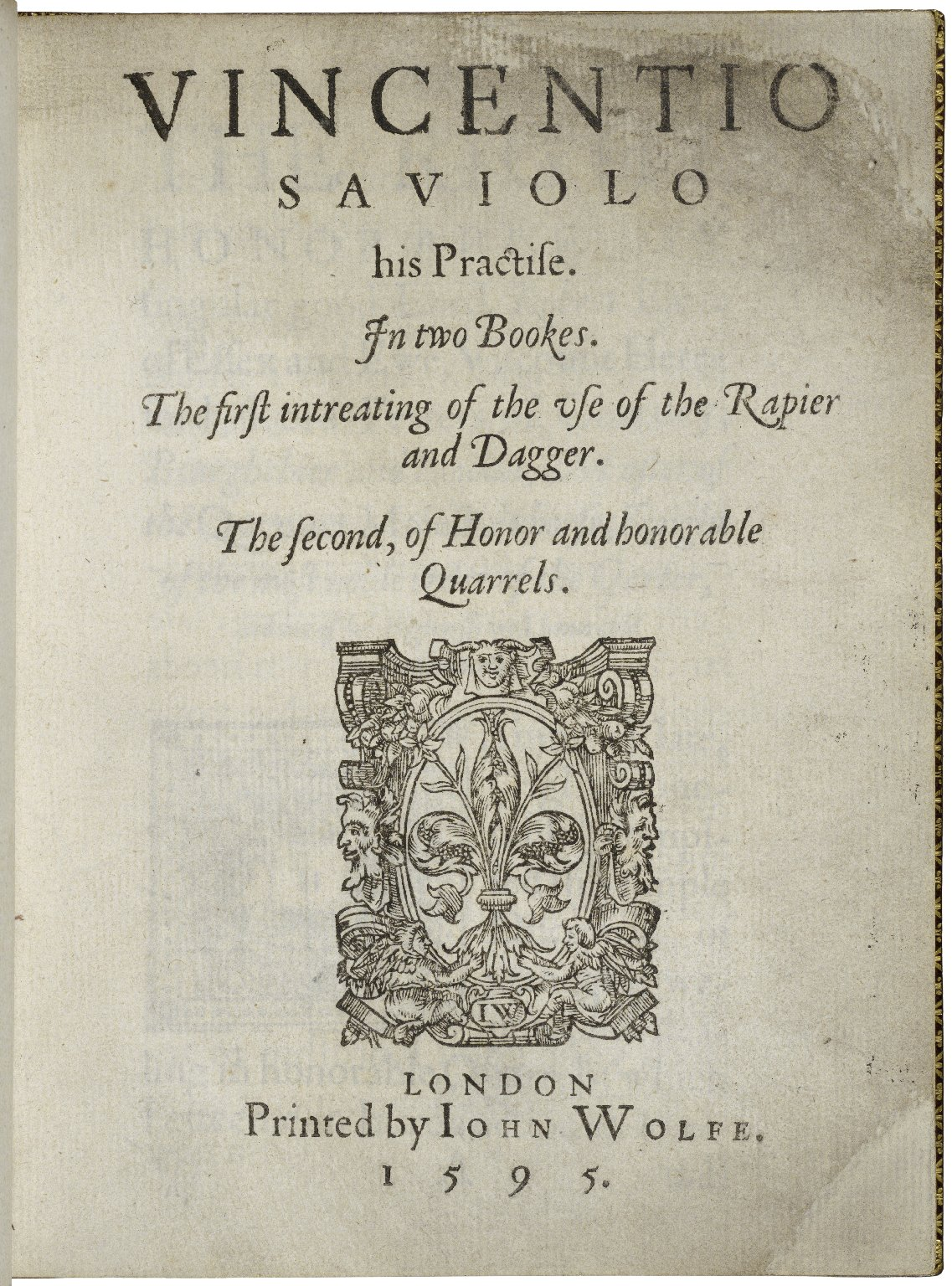
The title page from Vincentio Saviolo, His Practise, Saviolo's fencing handbook published in 1595.

Vincentio Saviolo (d. 1598/9) was an Italian fencing master, who wrote one of the first books on fencing to be available in the English language.

== Biography ==
Saviolo was born in Padua. He arrived in London at an unknown date and is first noted as being in England in 1589 when Richard Jones obtained a licence to publish his "Book of Honour". In 1591 John Florio described Saviolo's fencing school as being "in the little street where the well is...at the sign of the red Lyon." It was described by the English gentleman and fencing writer George Silver as being "within a bow shot" of what was later the Bell Savage or la Belle Sauvage, at this time "Savage's inn, otherwise called the Bell on the Hoop" ( Inns and Taverns of Old London by Henry C. Shelley, 1909), on Ludgate Hill. Saviolo's particular nemesis was this George Silver, who wrote his own book in 1599 to defend traditional English Swordsmanship against the encroachment of Italian rapier fencing and in doing so launched a vociferous attack on Saviolo and his system. Silver recounts how Saviolo's associate Jeronimo was killed in a sword fight by an Englishman known only as Cheese, but omits details of Saviolo's death (merely stating that he was dead by the time his own book was published in 1599). This suggests that Saviolo did not die at the hands of another swordsman.

Throughout the 16th century, handbooks became increasingly popular. In 1595, John Wolfe printed Vincentio Saviolo, his practise, in two bookes, the first intreating of the use of the Rapier and Dagger, the second of Honor and honorable quarrels in London. The first part of this work was written as a conversation between Saviolo and an imaginary student (a structure common in 16th-century handbooks). This part undertakes to instruct in the rapier and dagger fencing techniques of Saviolo's day. Saviolo did not teach the lunge, rather recommending circular movement around the opponent in the manner of contemporary Spanish rapier fencers. The second part, Of Honor and Honorable Quarrels, deals with dueling etiquette. Much of the material comes from the works of Girolamo Muzio, written in 1558.

== Modern Reconstruction ==
Despite being written in English, Saviolo's system has not proved as popular to those reconstructing historical rapier fencing as some other systems (such as the Italian rapier fencing systems of Salvator Fabris, Nicoletto Giganti and Ridolfo Capo Ferro. An early exponent of Saviolo's system was Stephen Hand of the Stoccata School of Defence in Australia who published annotated transcriptions of Saviolo's first book in the periodical Hammerterz Forum in the late 1990s and a paper outlining the cultural influences on Saviolo's system in 2002. Other notable practitioners of Saviolo's system include Cecil Longino of Academia Della Spada in Seattle, USA and Chris Chatfield of the 1595 Club in London and Brighton, U.K., Henry Walker and James Wran of Brisbane Swords, Australia.
