= Feder (fencing) =

Type of fencing sword

The Feder (plural Federn; also Fechtfeder, plural Fechtfedern) is a type of training sword used in Fechtschulen (fencing schools) of the German Renaissance. The type has existed since at least the 15th century, but it came to be widely used as a standard training weapon only in the 16th century (when longsword fencing had ceased to have a serious aspect of duelling, as duels were now fought with the rapier), shown extensively in the fighting manuals of the time, particularly those of Paulus Hector Mair and Joachim Meyer, and it remained in use in such Fechtschulen well into the 17th, and in some cases for much of the 18th century.

The origin of the term "Feder" for these swords is uncertain. The German word Feder means "feather" or "quill", but came to be used of metal springs in the 17th century (i.e. at about the same time as the name of the sparring weapon and possibly influenced by it). The term Fechtfeder itself seems to be connected to the name of the Federfechter, i.e. "feather fencers", a guild or brotherhood of fencers formed in 1570 in Prague. It is possible that the term Feder for the sparring sword arose in the late 16th century at first as a term of derision of the practice weapon used by the Federfechter (who were so called for unrelated reasons, because of a feather or quill used as their heraldic emblem) by their rivals, the Marx Brothers, who would tease the Federfechter as "fencing with quills" as opposed to with real weapons, or as scholars or academics supposedly better at "fighting with the quill" than at real fighting (reflecting the different professional backgrounds of the rival fencing guilds). Johann Fischart in his Gargantua (1575) already compares the fencing weapon to a "quill" writing in blood. The recharacterized term Federschwert is modern.

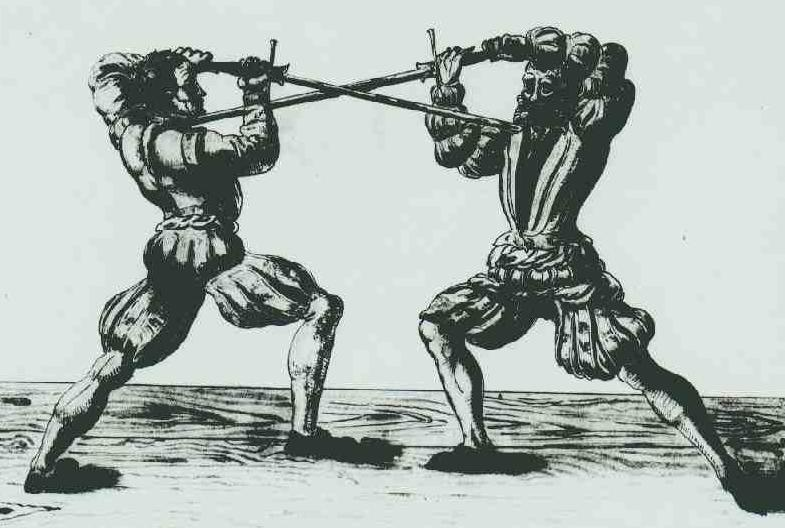
Federschwerter as shown in Paulus Hector Mair's Vienna manuscript (1540s)

The sword consists of a very thin, rounded blade with a large ricasso and a heavy hilt and pommel. Because of this, it has the same weight and center of balance as a real sword, and handles identically. This odd construction also has the effect of moving the sword's center of percussion to a theoretical point beyond its tip. The tip of a Federschwert is spatulated and may have been covered with a leather sleeve to make thrusting safer, though no direct historical evidence exists of such use.

Production of Fechtfedern has been revived in the 21st century for use as sparring weapons and for competition in the context of the Historical European martial arts revival. Among some HEMA groups, it is believed that certain historical Federn had gradually thinning hilts, though this is not always applied to modern reconstructions of the weapons. Additionally, the Schilden, the blade-catchers, of the modern reconstructions vary from flat squares to double-troughed Parierhaken. Some also have hilts customized into the shape of a wayward "S", and others' are extended about two inches. Pommel shapes also vary, between classic spheres, various polyhedrons, arming sword-style disks, or most commonly teardrops or eggs.

== See also ==
- Bokken
- Waster
- Zweihänder
