= Waster =

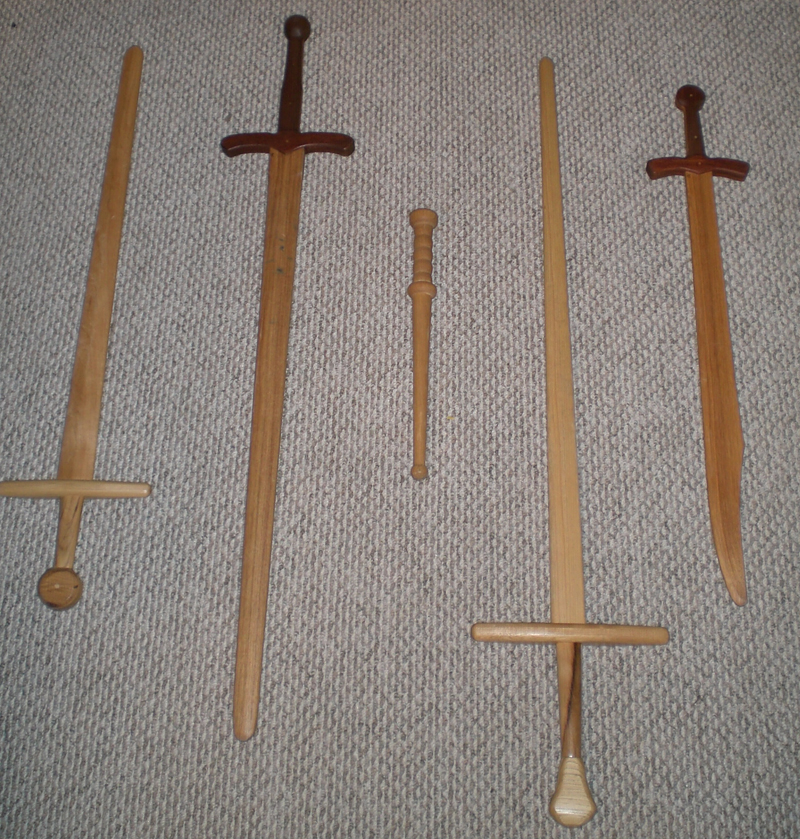
- From the left: arming sword, longsword, rondel, longsword, falchion
- Type: Practice weapon
- Place of origin: Western Europe

Service history
- In service: Late Bronze Age to current. Rare after the late 1800s.
- Used by: Soldiers and students

Specifications
- Mass: Longsword: 2–3 pounds (0.91–1.36 kg) Arming sword: 1–2 pounds (0.45–0.91 kg) Dagger: 0.5–1 pound (0.23–0.45 kg)
- Length: Longsword: 42–50 inches (110–130 cm) Arming sword: 32–42 inches (81–107 cm) Dagger: 17–19 inches (43–48 cm)
- Blade type: Wooden; lenticular (lens shaped) or diamond cross-section with blunted edges and tip
- Hilt type: Wooden; generally cruciform and full-tang, with functional pommel, cross, and oval cross-section grip

In martial arts, a waster is a practice weapon, usually a sword, and usually made out of wood, though nylon (plastic) wasters are also available. Nylon is safer than wood, due to it having an adequate amount of flex for thrusts to be generally safe, unlike wooden wasters, which generally have less flex than a steel feder. The use of wood or nylon instead of metal provides an economic option for initial weapons training and sparring, at some loss of genuine experience. A weighted waster may be used for a sort of strength training, theoretically making the movements of using an actual sword comparatively easier and quicker, though modern sports science shows that an athlete would most optimally train with an implement which is closest to the same weight, balance, and shape of the tool they will be using. Wasters as wooden practice weapons have been found in a variety of cultures over a number of centuries, including ancient China, Ireland, Iran, Scotland, Rome, Egypt, medieval and renaissance Europe, Japan, and into the modern era in Europe and the United States. Over the course of time, wasters took a variety of forms not necessarily influenced by chronological succession, ranging from simple sticks to clip-point dowels with leather basket hilts to careful replicas of real swords.

Used commonly in the modern historical European martial arts community, the term refers to wasters fashioned to resemble western European weapons like the longsword or arming sword. Historically, the term "waster" was used in English to refer to cudgels or clubs used as weapons, in addition to wooden swords. The increasingly popular historical martial arts reconstruction groups, as well as the live action role-playing and renaissance festival groups, have provided an ample market for commercial waster retailers. As the martial art has grown and academic interest has risen in weapons other than the longsword and arming sword, other types of wasters have been produced commercially.

The concept of wooden practice weapons is not limited to the historical european martial arts. Some Japanese martial arts involving swordsmanship, such as kenjutsu and iaido, use bokken or shinai as practice weapons. Eskrima, a martial art from the Philippines, also uses a type of rattan stick as a practice weapon in place of a blade. The martial art of singlestick is more or less entirely derived from the use of wasters as practice weapons in place of broadswords.

== Use ==
Historically, students and soldiers used wasters as inexpensive and expendable training tools. The cost of high quality steel weapons, especially swords, would have made them a poor choice for practice weapons. Constant training would fatigue the blade, rendering it far less effective and reliable as a weapon. To prevent the destruction of an expensive weapon and to permit the necessary training and sparring intrinsic to any martial art, wooden practice weapons were created.

Today, especially in the reconstruction of historical European martial arts and Historical reenactment, wasters have experienced renewed interest. Wasters provide a number of benefits to the modern practitioner, many of which would have applied to historic trainees as well. The wood construction coupled with unsharpened edges and blunted tip, crossguard, and pommel of wooden swords provides a safer alternative to practising with a sharpened or unsharpened steel weapon. Wasters do not cut flesh, but provide a decidedly blunt impact. The lower cost of ownership in comparison to a steel weapon of the same variety makes the waster a much more affordable and expendable tool. Many modern wasters are fashioned to replicate the original weapon with accuracy, including functional integral sword parts. This functionality allows the wooden weapon to be handled more like its steel counterpart.

Wasters are not without their faults. The all wooden construction usually makes wasters somewhat lighter and differently balanced than steel weapons. The difference of material properties between wood and steel creates a difference in performance when training and sparring. The wood wasters tend to recoil from strong contact with other wasters as may occur in a strong parry or absetzen, a phenomenon colloquially referred to as "waster bounce". Steel weapons do not display this attribute to the same extent, usually binding and sliding with minimal rebound instead. The use of wooden wasters is somewhat safe as it lacks a cutting edge, but does not equate a safer alternative to steel training swords. The use of wood with rounded edges prevents any cutting injury when sparring but because wooden weapons typically are typically thicker bladed (compared to flat steel training swords like feders) while being of similar weight to steel weapons, they impact much harder than the thin blades of steel training swords (whose weight is concentrated at the hilt rather than the thin blade, compared to the evenly weighted waster). In addition, because of the waster's strong wooden construction, it does not bend at thrusts like feders or some steel training swords. It is for those reasons strong cuts or thrusts to unprotected body parts during sparring may lead to significant blunt force injuries (with the wooden weapon acting like a bludgeon).

Modern historical martial arts reconstruction organizations, including the Association for Renaissance Martial Arts and the Chicago Swordplay Guild use wasters as the primary training tool of new practitioners. Wasters are used to learn, practice, and later spar with a variety of techniques including cuts, slices, thrusts and wards. During flourishes, a waster may be substituted for a blunt sword, especially if a lack of experience is a concern. Participants may also use wasters against a pell, a training pole roughly simulating a human target. As the individual becomes more skilled, they will begin to use blunt steel weapons which offer a more realistic set of properties in comparison with a sharpened metal blade.

== Construction ==
Modern commercial producers use primarily Hickory, a hard and resilient wood, in the construction of their wasters. Some producers allow individuals to accent the waster with wood of other types including Jatobá and Purpleheart. Manufacturers usually apply a coating of linseed oil or other protective liquid and instruct users to regularly apply it. This prevents splintering and works to create a stronger, more enduring tool. Different specimens of wood, even of the same variety, are not necessarily identical in performance, and may display different characteristics during use.

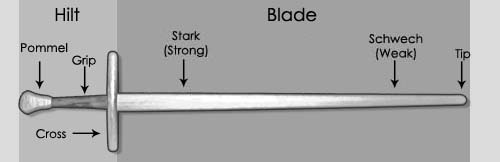
Wasters generally contain many of the same parts as swords, though lack many of the minor aesthetic details. Here, the major parts of a typical longsword are labeled on a superimposed image of a modern-day waster. The blunted pommel, cross, edges, and tip are safety features.

The form of modern wasters follows from their use as replica training swords. Blades on wasters have a lenticular (lens-shaped) or diamond cross-section and defined edges. This shape continues into the hilt, which features a grip with an oval-shaped cross section oriented in the same plane as the blade. An integral part of historical swords, this oval shape permits the wielder to know the sword's rotational blade alignment by feeling for the position of the oblong grip in their hand. The pommel acts as suitable counterweight for the blade and a stable gripping surface, providing the sword's intrinsic balance and allowing the user a weighted leverage point for more powerful manipulation of the weapon. A functional cross acts as it does on a steel sword, protecting the hands and assisting in a number of guards and parries. During half-swording, the cross and pommel may also function as a striking portions of the weapon, used directly to cause injury as in the mordhau.

== History ==
Wooden practice swords have been in use since the Late Bronze Age, with an original sword found on Orkney's Mainland in Scotland still in existence at the National Museum of Edinburgh. A similar find in Ireland adds historical backing to the Irish myth, the Táin Bó Cúailnge, in which the use of a wooden training sword is mentioned. Egyptian soldiers practiced a sort of sport fencing using blunt sticks as a sort of primitive waster. The Romans used a form of wooden sword, the rudis, for combat training. Translations of Roman poets Horace and Juvenal provide evidence of this training weapon in use. One translation of Juvenal's poetry by Barten Holyday in 1661 makes note that the Roman trainees learned to fight with the wooden wasters before moving on to the use of sharpened steel, much in the way modern reconstruction groups progress. In fact, it is also found that Roman gladiators trained with a heavy wooden sword against a straw man or a wooden pole known as a palus (an early relative of the later wooden pell). Wasters are mentioned in period works, including The Book of the Courtier. A number of Fechtbücher also mention the use of wasters or depict them in use by models showing proper technique.

During the 16th century, the Dussack came into use in German fencing schools. A true waster, the dussack was made almost entirely of wood (in all but one known case) and acted as safe and cheap training weapon. The weapon's unique shape did not lend well to the replication of traditional cruciform-hilted swords like the arming sword or longsword. Instead, the dussack resembled the großes Messer or "great knife", a weapon found more often amongst the common people than longswords, the cost of which allowed only relatively wealthy individuals to purchase them.

=== Swords ===
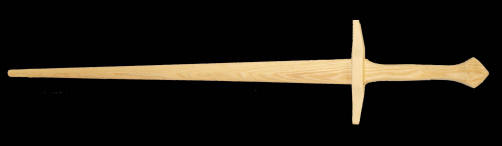
Ash Longsword

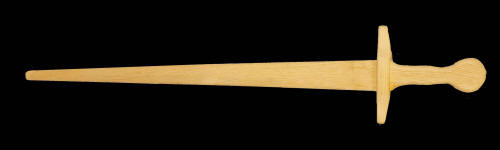
Ash Arming Sword Waster

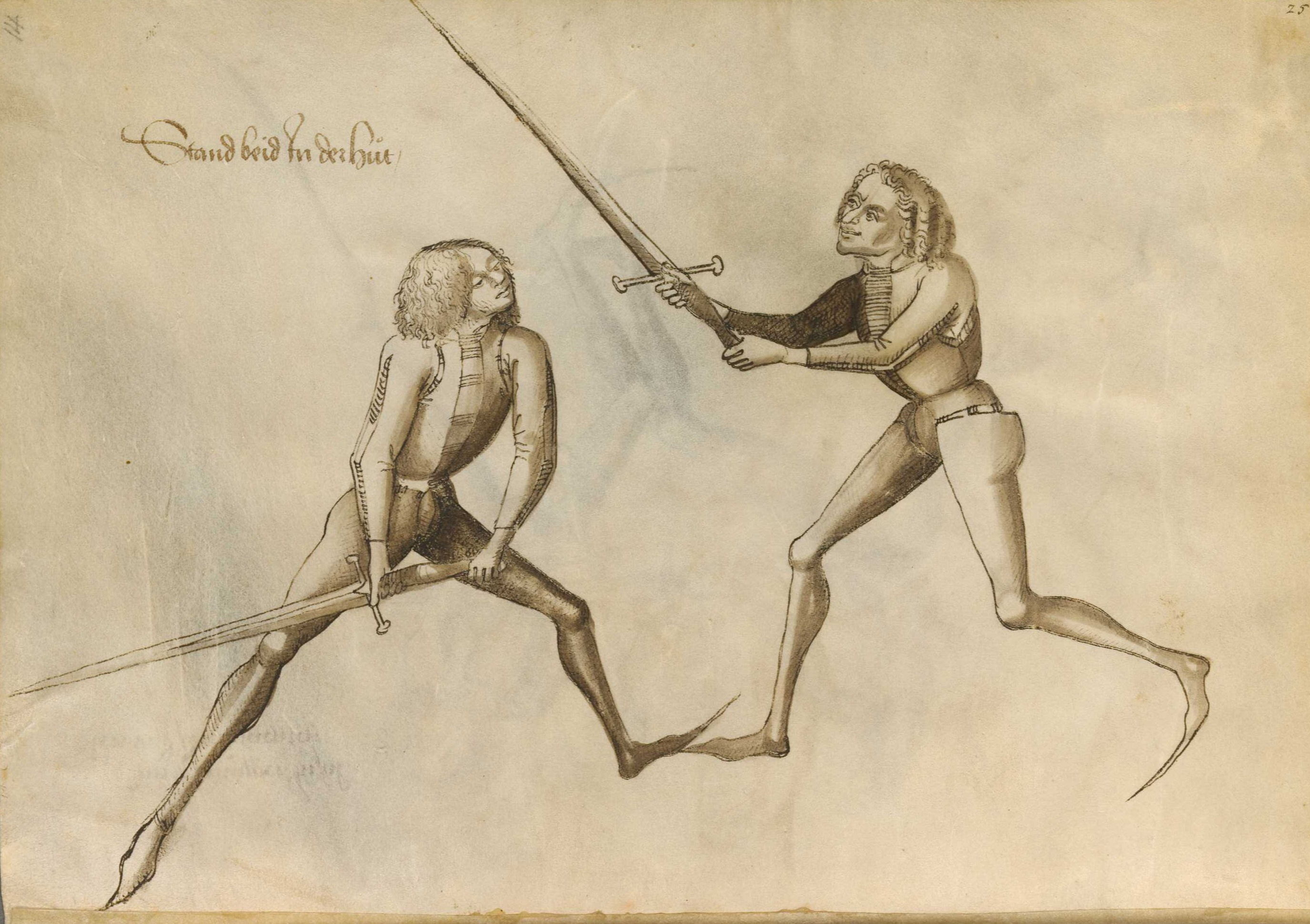
Talhoffer's Fechtbuch (1467), Plate 25. Two longsword fencers

Longsword wasters are generally between forty-two and fifty inches long and are also known colloquially as Hand-and-a-Half swords, allowing the use of both hands on the hilt while using them. These weapons incorporate a ridge or fuller, defined edges, and other sword components commonly found on steel swords. Many of the fundamentals taught by Johannes Lichtenauer and his students Sigmund Ringeck and Hans Talhoffer frequently involve the longsword.

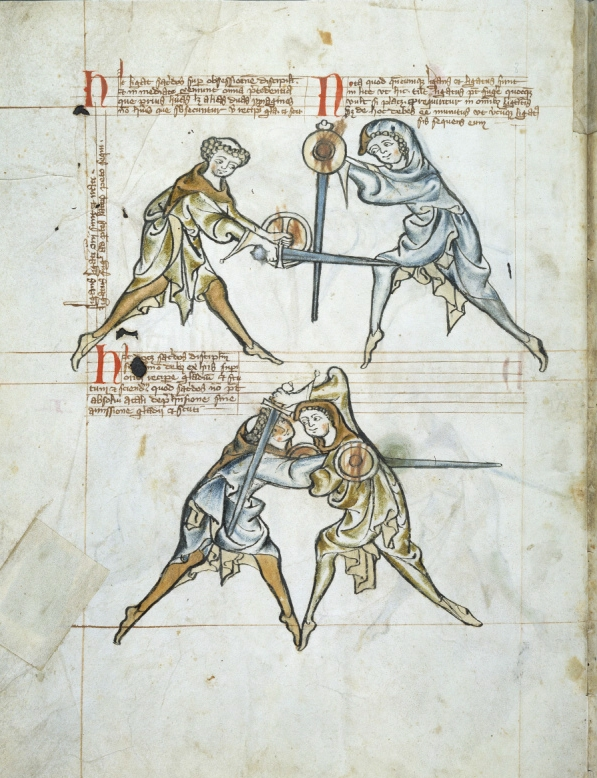
MS I.33, fol. 4v. Student and priest using Arming swords and bucklers

Arming sword wasters span the broad gap of thirty-two to forty-two inches in length and, like their historical counterparts, have a shorter hilt than a longsword, allowing only one full hand to hold the grip. These wasters also commonly feature defined edges, pommels, and other typical sword elements. Arming swords are featured heavily in the combat of Manuscript I.33, the oldest manuscript on sword-and-buckler fighting, dating approximately to the turn of the 14th century.

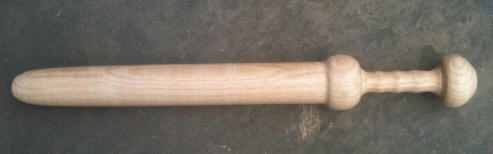
Rudis/Rudius

The ceremonial rudius, a wooden gladius given ceremonially to gladiators when they won enough battles to become free men, is produced by some current day vendors and is twenty-eight to thirty inches long. The producers warn that the rudii are for ceremonial purposes, however, and should not be used in mock combat. In this sense, the waster supersedes its place as a tool for combat and becomes primarily a work of art.

Dussacks and falchion, two-handed sword, cut and thrust sword, gladius, Viking sword and rapier wasters are not widely available from commercial vendors, but may be special ordered or hand-crafted.

=== Daggers ===
Rondel dagger wasters, like the daggers themselves, are generally about eighteen inches in length, with a twelve-inch blade and six inch hilt. These weapons may forgo defined edges altogether and take on a more cylindrical shape as the rondel dagger acted historically as a thrusting and stabbing weapon. Hilted dagger wasters are also available, featuring functional crosses and defined edges, often found in lengths of about 18 inches.

== See also ==
- Bokken a form of waster used in Budō
- Dussack a specific form of German waster
- Eskrima uses a rattan stick to represent the sword
- Federschwert a steel practice sword
- Singlestick a basket-hilted wooden practise-weapon for broadsword fencing

== General references ==
- Clements, John. Get Thee a Waster! – Used within Use & History sections.
- Little Raven. Frequently Asked Questions – Used within Use, Construction & Types sections.
- New Stirling Arms. About Our Wasters – Used within Use, Construction & Types sections.
- Purpleheart Armoury. Frequently Asked Questions – Used within Use, Construction & Types sections.
