= Wooden sword =

Wooden sword may refer to:

- Bokken, a Japanese wooden sword used for training in kenjutsu
- Macuahuitl, a wooden sword with several embedded obsidian blades
- Waster, a practice weapon, usually a sword, and usually made out of wood
