= Brotherhood of Saint Mark =

Early modern German fencing organization

The Brotherhood of Saint Mark (German: Marxbrüder, "Marx brothers") was an organization of German swordsmen active in the early modern period.

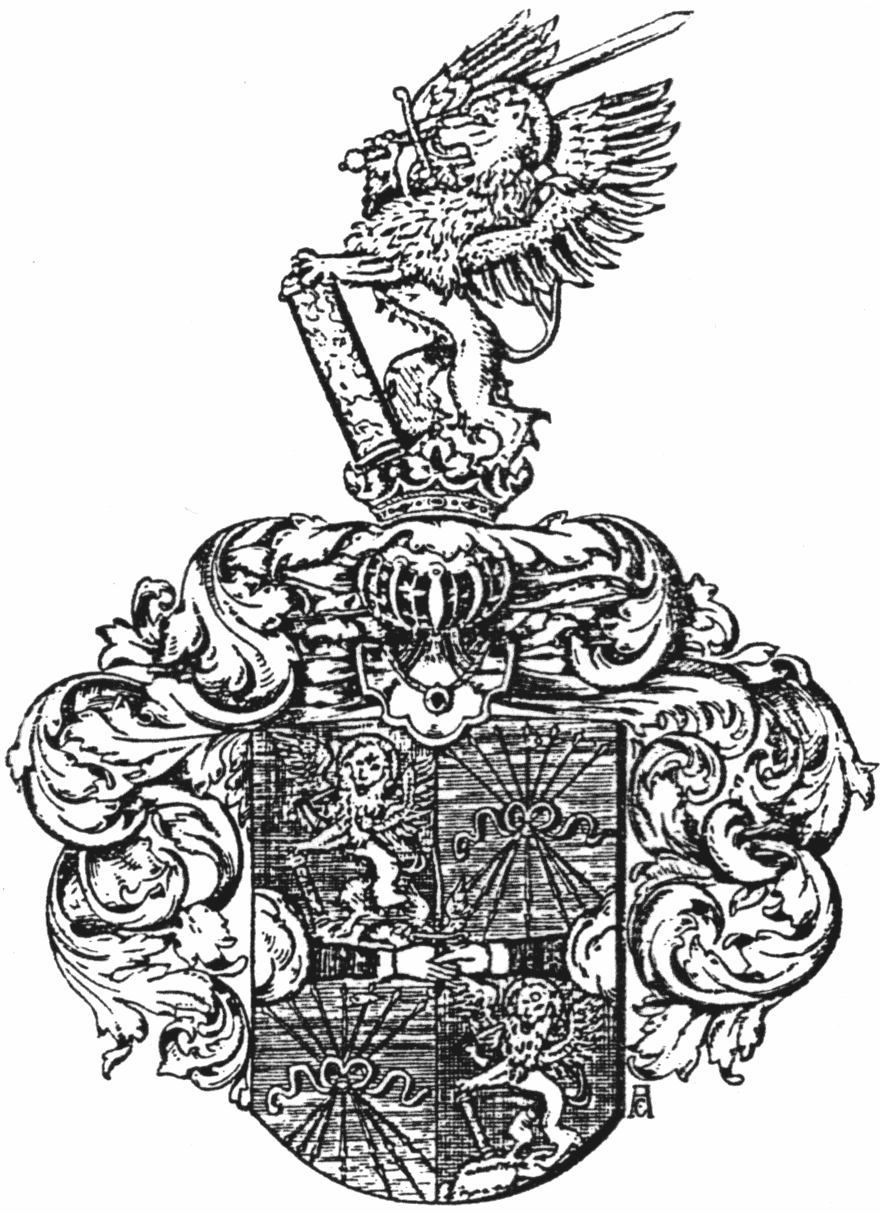
Coat of Arms of the Brotherhood of Saint Mark

== History ==
The brotherhood originated in 15th-century Nuremberg at an uncertain date and may have been co-founded by fencing master Hans Talhoffer. The earliest written record, dating from 1474, calls them "Brotherhood of Our Dear Lady and Pure Virgin Mary and the Holy and Mighty Heavenly Prince Saint Mark". The group later moved to Frankfurt, where it held annual meetings and elected a new Hauptmann (captain) every two years.

In 1487, Frederick III granted them the monopoly on the title Meister des langen Schwerts ("master of the long sword"), effectively making them a fencing guild. After their recognition by Frederick, the brotherhood was usually called Marxbrüder ("Marx brothers").

Woodcuts, some by Albrecht Dürer, as well as other references indicate that the Marxbrüder taught a range of weapons, including the longsword, dussack, rapier, spear, and quarterstaff.

== Competing organizations ==
A second fencing brotherhood, the Federfechter, was established in Prague in 1570, and officially recognized by the city of Frankfurt in 1575, despite protests by the Marxbrüder. From 1607, the two societies held equal privileges, when the Federfechter received a letter of privilege from Emperor Rudolph II.

A possible third group were the Luxbrüder ("Saint Luke brothers"). However, they never received formal recognition, and may have been regarded more as an unruly association of fencers rather than as a structured fencing guild.

== Notable members ==
- Hans Talhoffer – possible early member or founder (speculated as the lion of St Mark appears in his 1459 coat of arms)
- Peter Falkner – captain 1502–1506 and author of at least two fencing manuals
- Anton Rast – captain 1522–1526 and author of a fencing manual completed by Paulus Hector Mair
