= MS 862 =

MS 862 may refer to:

- Minuscule 862, 12th-century Greek manuscript of the New Testament
- Cluny Fechtbuch, German martial arts manual from about 1500
