= Henricus von Gunterrodt =

German fencing author

Heinrich von Gunterrodt (1557- † unknown) was a German fencing master and author. In 1579, he published a treatise on the art of fencing dedicated to Johann VII of Mecklenburg titled, De veriis principiis artis dimicatoriae Tractatus brevis (The True Principles of the Art of Fencing).

This book was the first to mention the Walpurgis or Lutegerus Fechtbuch (FECHT 1), which Gunterrodt claimed was given to him by the mercenary, beltmaker and celebrated swordsman Johann Herbart von Würzburg. He in turn had had looted it during his military service from 1552-1553 to Albrecht 'Bellator' II, Margrave of Brandenburg-Kulmbach.

== Jacobean courtier ==
Another member of the family with a similar name, perhaps the same man, joined the court of James VI and I and Anne of Denmark (a granddaughter of John VII of Mecklenburg-Schwerin) in London. Henry de Gunderot performed in a tournament as a defender of Truth against Opinion in the Barriers at a Marriage at the January 1606 wedding of Frances Howard and the Earl of Essex. He was knighted by King James on 13 February 1608 and acted as a diplomatic envoy. The courtier's surname is spelled in a variety of ways in English records, and he was described as a "Teutonicus", a German. French diplomats called him "Guenetrot". The Venetian diplomat Antonio Foscarini wrote his name as "Signor Ghintrot" in July 1608, and Marc' Antonio Correr called him "Ghundrot", a Bohemian. He moved to Dresden and the service of Christian II of Saxony in 1611.
