= Langort =

Langort is a position in the German School of historical fencing. In the Langort position, the point of the sword is extended. The term appears first in Royal Armouries Ms. I.33.

In modern literature, sometimes it is identified with the position vom tage in the system of Johannes Liechtenauer, according to Ms. Nürnberger Handschrift GNM 3227a. Although vom tage is executed with both hands and sword high over the head, while "Langort" is executed with both hands pointing away from the body, directly at the contrahent. Also, vom tage is a very active position that gives you the opportunity to start a variety of attacks, while "Langort" is highly defensive and passive, mostly used to force a contrahent with shorter blade to keep distance. The only real possibility to attack while standing in this position is by running into a highly incautious opponent. Otherwise standing in this position means to force your contrahent to either attack your blade or to run into the sword, which can create nearly insurmountable situations in combat.
