= Jörg Wilhalm =

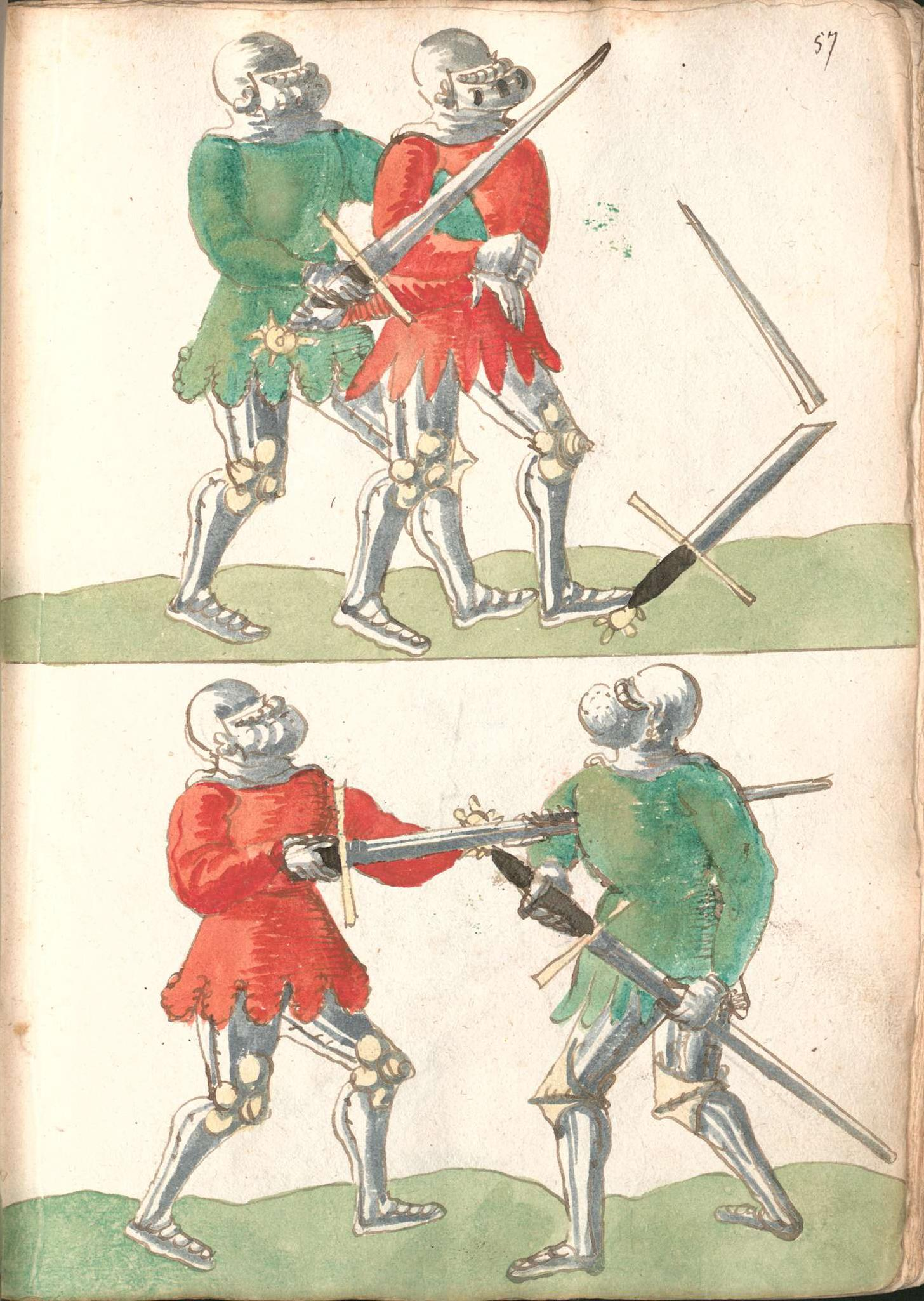
armoured foot combat, with a rare depiction of a broken sword (Cgm 3711 fol. 57r)

Jörg Wilhalm was an early 16th-century German fencing master, hatter, and citizen of Augsburg.

There are six Fechtbücher attributed to Wilhalm:

- 1522 Cod.I.6.4°.5, 47 folia, Augsburg University library, bought by Paulus Hector Mair in 1552.
- 1522 Cod.I.6.2°.3, 43 folia, Augsburg University library, bought by Mair in 1561.
- 1523 Cod.I.6.2°.2, 72 folia, Augsburg University library, bought by Mair in 1544.
- 1523 Cgm 3711, 102 folia, Munich.
- Cgm 3712, 212 folia, Munich.
- MS 862

MS Cgm 3711 is peculiar in that some of the fencers are represented in humorous carnival costumes.

== See also ==
- Fechtbuch
- Historical European Martial Arts
