= Ward (fencing) =

Defensive position in fencing

A ward or guard (translating German Hut "protection") is a defensive position in the German school of swordsmanship. In Royal Armouries Ms. I.33 the concept is rendered as custodia "guard".
