= Liutger =

Liutger, also spelled Liudger, Ludger, or Leodegar, Latinized as Lutegerus, is a German male personal name, composed of liut 'people' and ger 'spear'.

- Saint Ludger (died 809), Frisian missionary and the first bishop of Münster
- Lutegerus is the putative author of MS I.33
- Leodegar (615-679), Burgundian bishop
- Leodegario Santa Cruz (born 1988), Mexican boxer
