= Cologne Fechtbuch =

Historical martial arts manual

The Cologne Fechtbuch (Kölner Fechtbuch) is a historical martial arts manual, formerly kept at the Historical Archive of the City of Cologne (Best. 7020, 150; formerly W* 8 150, still earlier W. IX 16, from the collection of Ferdinand Franz Wallraf). It was lost, presumably destroyed, in the collapse of the building on 3 March 2009.

The manuscript was on paper, bound in page of vellum taken from a 13th-century evangeliary. On 23 folia, it contains combat instructions in five parts, loosely associated with the German school of fencing. The language shows influence of the Ripuarian dialect, and it is likely that the manuscript was written in the area of Cologne during the early 16th century.

The five parts of the manual deal with the long sword (langes sweerd), unarmed grappling (ryngen), the messer and dagger (degen), the boar spear (swynspeyß) and the staff (stangh), respectively.

The manuscript was edited in facsimile and transcription by Bauer (2009).

== Literature ==
- Matthias Johannes Bauer, Langes Schwert und Schweinespieß. Die Fechthandschrift aus den verschütteten Beständen des Historischen Archivs der Stadt Köln, ADEVA, Graz, 2009.
