= Hans Talhoffer =

German fencing master

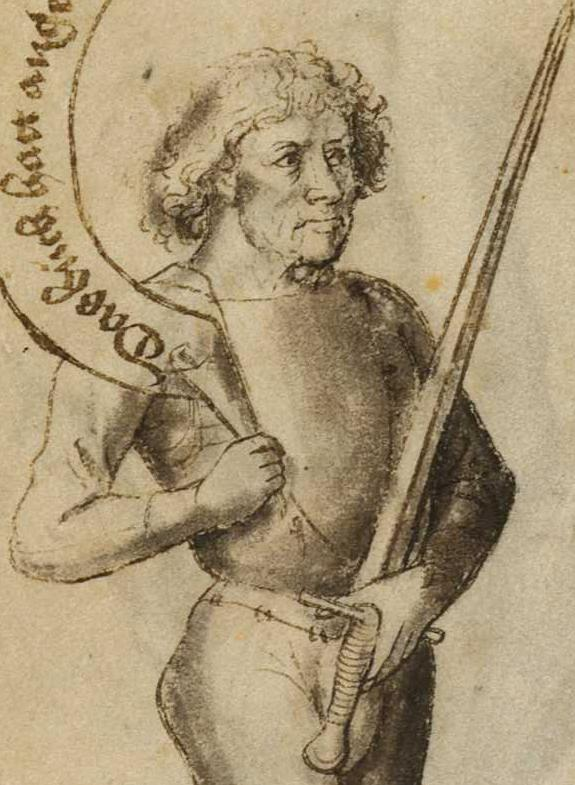
- Portrait of Talhoffer from 1467.
- Born: c. 1410-1415; Swabia (Germany)
- Died: after 1482
- Occupations: Fencing master Mercenary
- Employer(s): David and Buppellin vom Stain; Eberhardt I von Württemberg; Luithold von Königsegg
- Organization: Marxbrüder (?)
- Notable work: List of manuscripts: Ms. Chart.A.558* (1443); Ms. XIX.17-3* (1446-1459); Ms. Thott.290.2º* (1459); Ms. 78.A.15 (1450s); Cod.icon. 394a* (1467); Ms. KK5342 (1480-1500); Cod.I.6.2º.1 (before 1561); Cod.Ser.Nov.2978 (1500s); Ms. 26.236 (1600s); 2° Ms. iurid. 29 (1600s); 2º Codex MS Philos. 61 (late 1600s); Cod.Guelf.125.16.Extrav. (late 1600s); Cod. icon. 394 (1820); Cod. icon. 395 (ca. 1820) * Archetypes

Signature
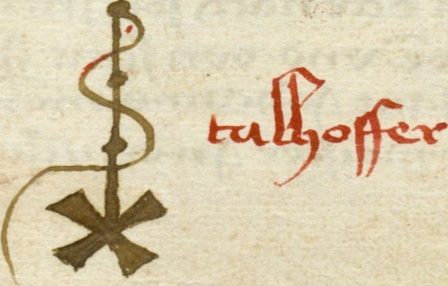

Hans Talhoffer (Dalhover, Talhouer, Thalhoffer, Talhofer; c. 1410-1415 – after 1482) was a German fencing master. His martial lineage is unknown, but his writings make it clear that he had some connection to the tradition of Johannes Liechtenauer, the grand master of a well-known Medieval German school of fencing. Talhoffer was a well-educated man who took interest in astrology, mathematics, onomastics, and the auctoritas and the ratio. He authored at least five fencing manuals during the course of his career, and appears to have made his living teaching, including training people for trial by combat.

== Life ==
The first known reference to Talhoffer is in 1433, when he represented Johann II von Reisberg, archbishop of Salzburg, before the Vehmic court. Shortly thereafter in 1434, Talhoffer was arrested and questioned by order of Wilhelm von Villach (a footman to Albrecht III von Wittelsbach, duke of Bavaria) in connection to the trial of a Nuremberg aristocrat named Jacob Auer, accused of murdering of his brother. Auer's trial was quite controversial and proved a major source of contention and regional strife for the subsequent two years. Talhoffer himself remained in the service of the archbishop for at least a few more years, and in 1437 is mentioned as serving as a bursary officer (Kastner) in Hohenburg.

The 1440s saw the start of Talhoffer's career as a professional fencing master. His first fencing manuscript, the Ms. Chart.A.558, was a personal reference book created in ca. 1443. The fencing manual portion is largely text-less and it may have been designed as a visual aid for use in teaching; in addition to these illustrations, it also contains an astrological treatise and a version of Konrad Kyeser's famous war book Bellifortis. Most significant among the noble clients that Talhoffer served in this period was the Königsegg family of southern Germany, and some time between 1446 and 1459 he produced the Ms. XIX.17-3 for this family. This work depicts a judicial duel being fought by Luithold von Königsegg as well as the training that Talhoffer gave him in preparation, but it seems that this duel never actually took place.

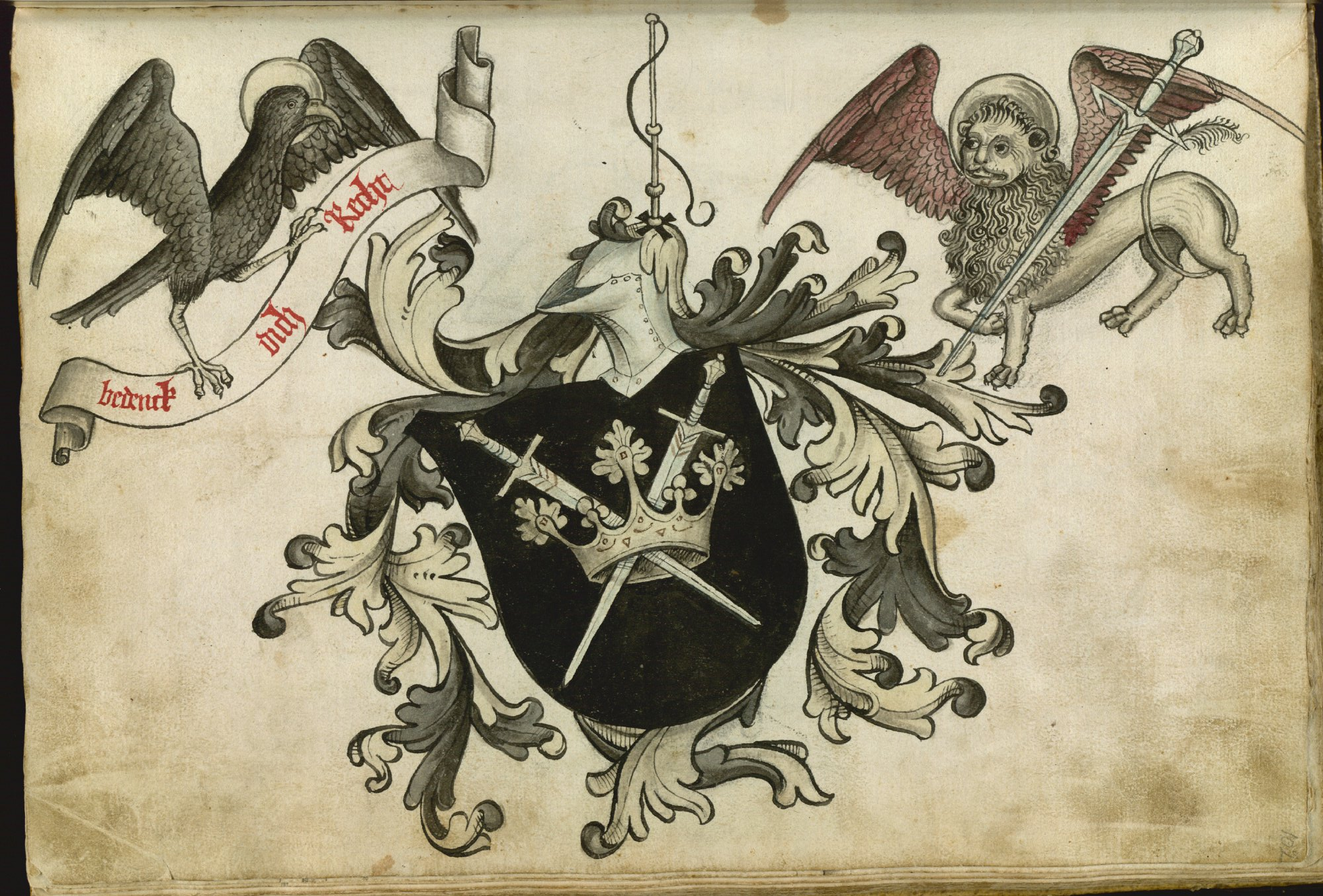
Talhoffer's coat of arms, including the Lion of St. Mark

Talhoffer's name appears again in the records of the city of Zürich in 1454, where he was chartered to teach fencing in some capacity and to adjudicate judicial duels. The account notes that a fight broke out among his students and had to be settled in front of the city council, resulting in various fines. He seems to have passed through Emerkingen later in the 1450s, where he was contracted to train the brothers David and Buppellin vom Stain; he also produced the Ms. 78.A.15 for them, a significantly expanded version of the Königsegg manuscript.

In 1459, Talhoffer commissioned the Ms. Thott.290.2º, a new personal fencing manual along the same lines as his 1443 work but expanded with additional content and captioned throughout. He appears to have continued instructing throughout the 1460s, and in 1467 he produced his final manuscript, the Cod. icon. 394a, for another of his noble clients, Eberhardt I von Württemberg. This would be his most comprehensive work, and the count paid 10 Guilder as well as quantities of rye and oats for the finished work.

While only a few facts are known about Talhoffer's life, this has not stopped authors from conjecture. The presence of the Lion of St. Mark in Talhoffer's 1459 coat of arms (right) has given rise to speculation that he may have been an early member or even a founder of the Frankfurt-am-Main-based Marxbrüder fencing guild, though there is no record of their existence prior to 1474. Additionally, much has been made of the fact that Talhoffer's name doesn't appear in Paulus Kal's list of members of the Society of Liechtenauer. While some have speculated that this indicates rivalry or ill-will between the two contemporaries, Kal's list seems to be a memorial to masters who were already deceased, so it is more likely that Talhoffer was simply still alive in ca. 1470 (just three years after writing his final treatise).

== Works ==
Talhoffer's writings exist in well over a dozen manuscripts created in the fifteenth through nineteenth centuries; they have also been published a number of times beginning in 1893, including translations into English and French. His writings cover a wide assortment of weapons, including the arming sword, buckler, crossbow, dagger, flail, longknife, longshield, longsword, mace, poleaxe, spear, and unarmed grappling, often both armored and unarmored, on horse and on foot, and in scenarios including tournaments, formal duels, and unequal encounters implying urban self-defense. Despite the obvious care and detail that went into the artwork, the manuscripts generally have only a few words captioning each page (and in many cases none at all).

There are four known archetype copies of Talhoffer's works:

- The Ms.Chart.A.558 was probably created in 1443. The original currently rests in the holdings of the Universitäts- und Forschungsbibliothek Erfurt/Gotha in Gotha, Germany. This is the earliest of the four known archetypes and Hils speculates that it was created as a personal reference book. Aside from Talhoffer's own work, this manuscript also contains Johannes Hartlieb's Onomatomantia and Johannes Liechtenauer's Zettel.
- The Ms.XIX.17-3 was created some time between 1446 and the creation of the Thott manuscript in 1459. The original currently rests in the private collection of the Königsegg-Aulendorf family in Königseggwald, Germany. This manuscript may possibly have been commissioned by the very Luithold von Königsegg who is featured in several of Talhoffer's works.
- The Ms.Thott.290.2º was created in 1459; it was scribed by Michel Rotwyler and illustrated by Clauss Pflieger. The original currently rests in the holdings of Det Kongelige Bibliotek in Copenhagen, Denmark. This manuscript was likely a reference book created for Talhoffer's personal use, and is much more lavish than the 1443. Aside from his own teachings, this manuscript also includes Liechtenauer's Zettel and Konrad Kyeser's Bellifortis ("Battle Force"). On the final ten folia, the text is inverted and opening the book from the back reveals a brief treatise on a variety of esoteric subjects by Jud Ebreesch.
- The Fechtbuch von 1467 (Cod.icon. 394a) -- the "Fight Book" or Combat Manual of 1467 -- was created in 1467 on the commission of Count Eberhardt I von Württemberg. The original currently rests in the holdings of Bayerische Staatsbibliothek in Munich, Germany. This is Talhoffer's final work, as well as the only one to treat the topic of unarmored longsword at length.

For a complete list of the known manuscripts incorporating Talhoffer's work, see the infobox.

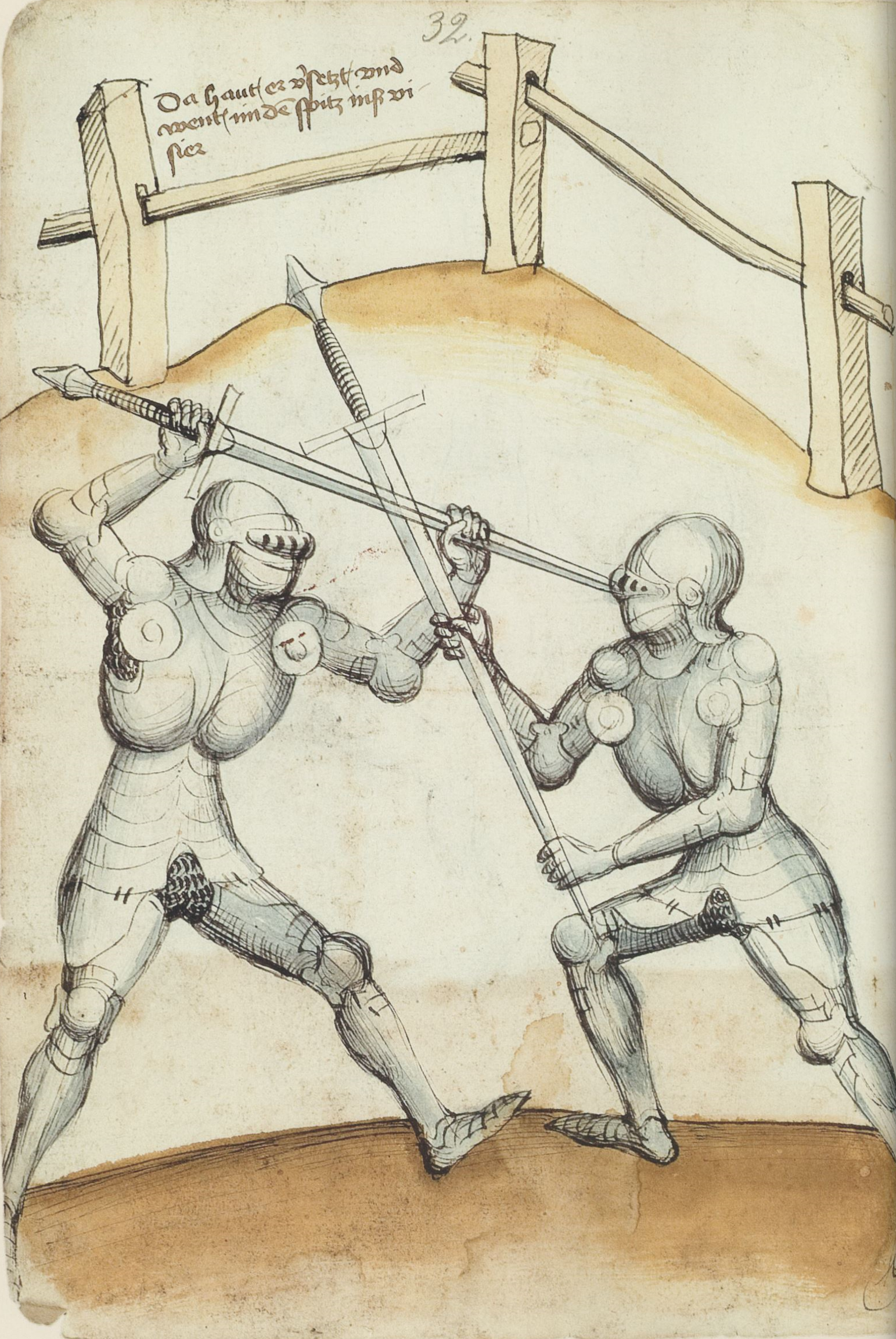
From MS XIX.17-3 showing a technique for armoured knights

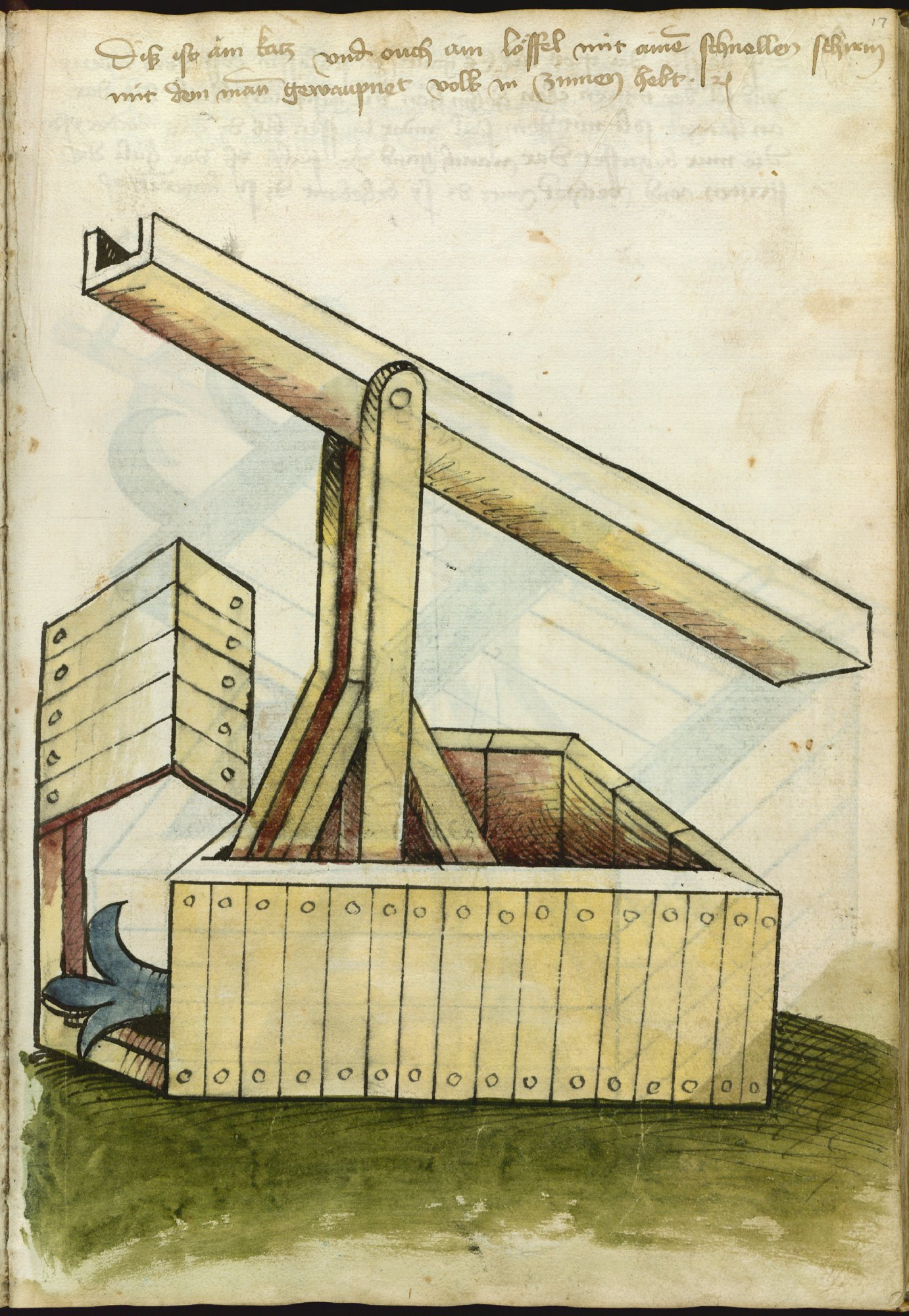
From Ms.Thott.290.2º which contains colourful images of various devices as well as fighting techniques

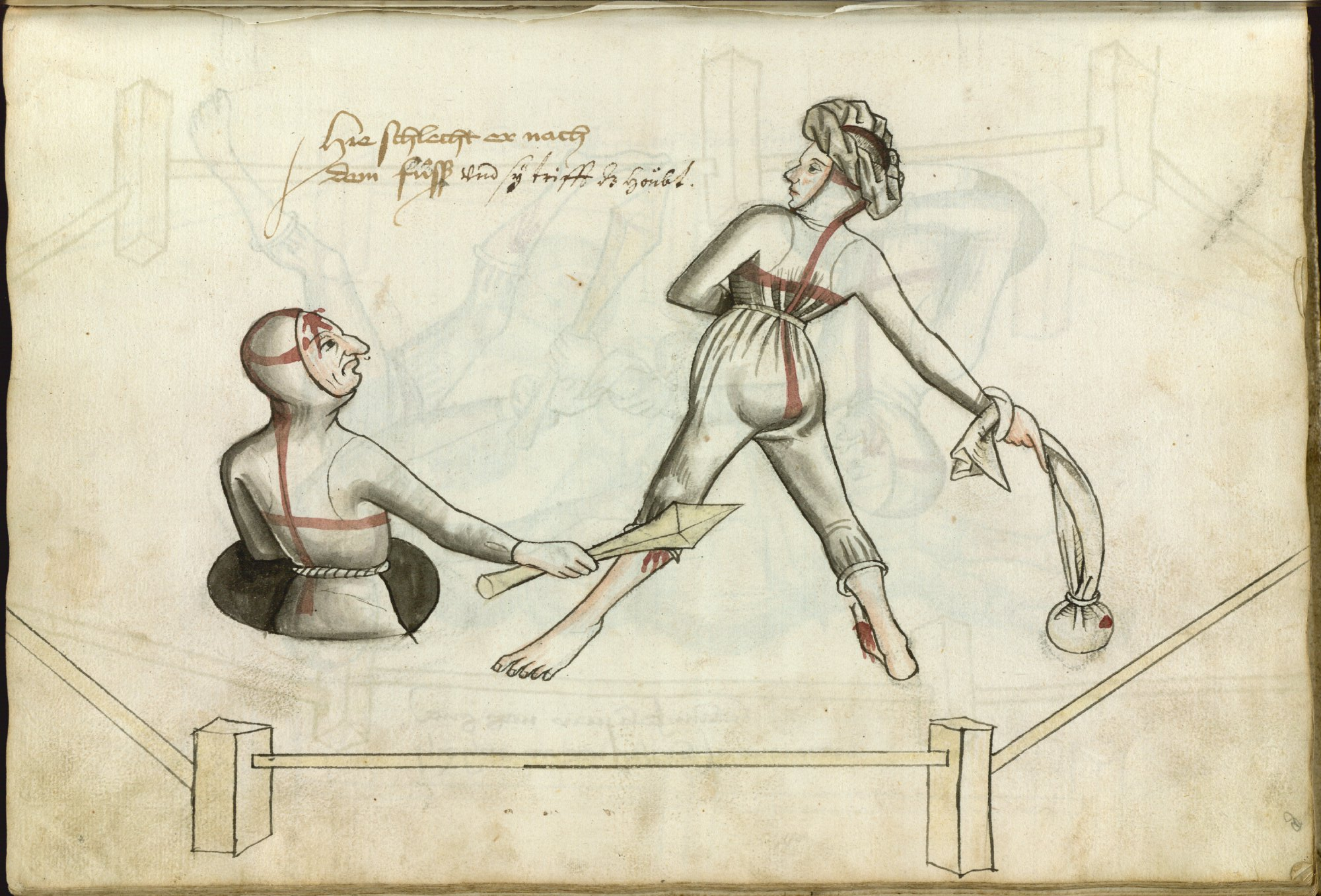
From Ms.Thott.290.2º showing a duel between a man and a woman

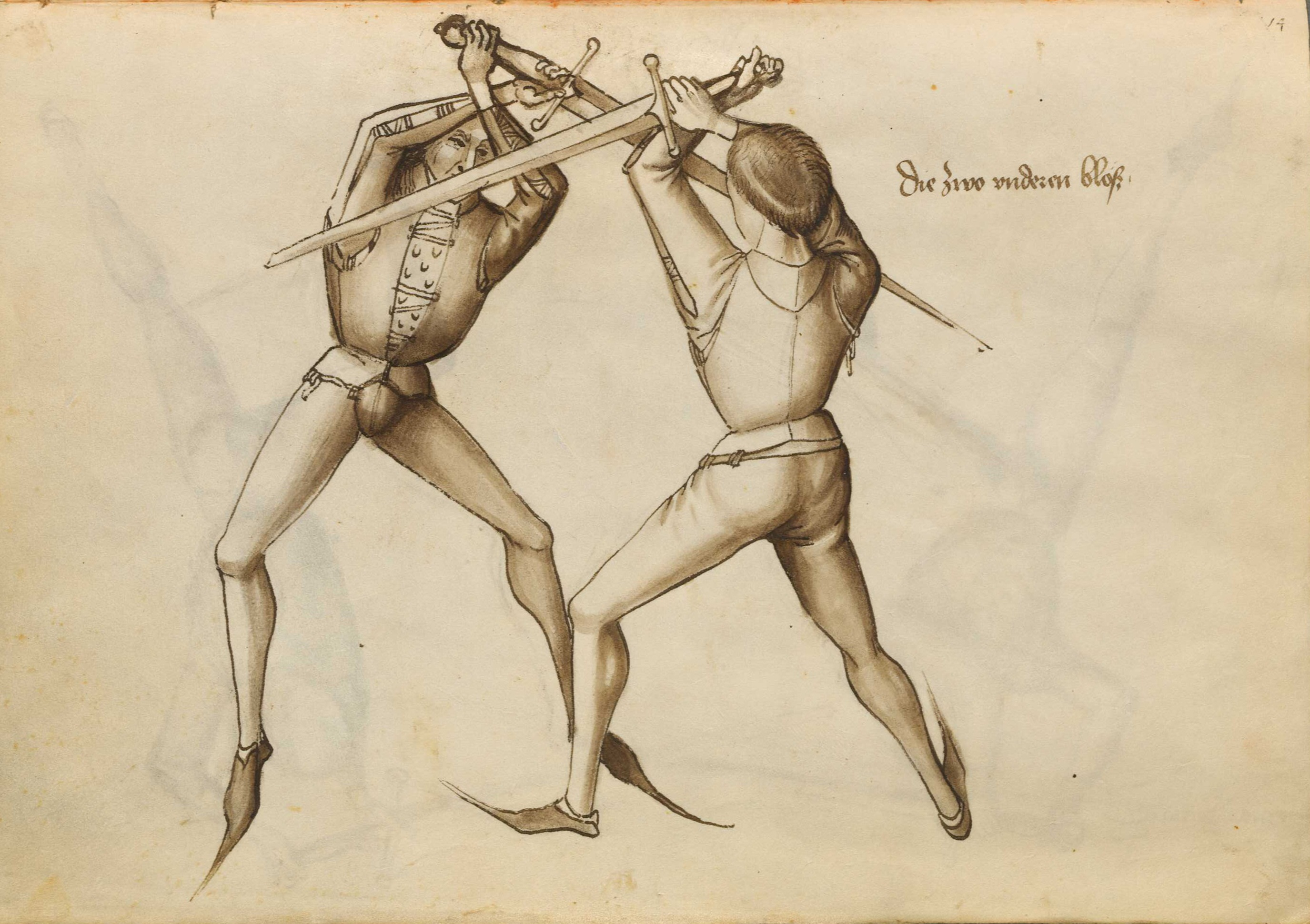
From Cod.icon. 394a showing a technique for unarmored longsword

== See also ==
- German school of swordsmanship
- Historical European Martial Arts
