= Folia (disambiguation) =

Folia is a well-known, simple musical framework that has been used for songs, dances and sets of variations.

Folia or Folía may also refer to:

== Music ==
=== Composition ===
- Folias, by Alessandro Piccinini (1566–c.1638)
- Folias, by Francesco Corbetta (c.1615–1681)
- Folia, by Giovanni Paolo Foscarini (fl. 1621–1649)
- Folias, by Lucas Ruis Ribayaz (c.1626–1667)
- Folias, by Antonio de Cabezón (1510–1566)
- Folia, by Bernardo Storace (1637–1707)
- Folias, by Gaspar Sanz (1640–1710)
- Folias, for guitar, by Francisco Guerau (1649–1721)
- Folias (a 3), by Andrea Falconieri (1650)
- "La folia" Violin Sonata Op. 5 No. 12 in D minor, by Corelli (1653–1713)
- "La folia", for viola, by Marin Marais (1656-1728)
- Variations on 'La Folia', by Alessandro Scarlatti (1660–1725)
- La Folia, by Antonio Vivaldi (1678–1741)
- "La Folia" Concerto grosso after Corelli, No. 12 in D minor Geminiani (1687–1762)
- Folias de España, 20 variations and fugue for guitar, by Manuel Ponce (1930)
- La Folia Variants, by Nils Vigeland (born 1950)
- Folias, for guitar & orchestra by Roberto Sierra (2004)

=== Albums ===
- La Folia, a 1982 album by Atrium Musicae de Madrid, Gregorio Paniagua
- Folias & Canarios, a 1994 album by Jordi Savall
- Folías (album), a 2007 album by el Guincho
- Folias, a 2011 recording by Nils Mönkemeyer
- La Folia, a 2014 album by Jordi Savall

== Other uses ==
- Folia (tunicate), a genus of animals in the family Oikopleuridae
- La Folia Barockorchester, a 2007 chamber music ensemble based in Dresden
- Folias Flute and Guitar Duo, an American chamber music duo

== See also ==
- Folium (disambiguation), the singular of folia
