= Jörg Breu the Elder =

German painter (c. 1475–1537)

Bernard of Clairvaux curing a possession, Zwettl altarpiece

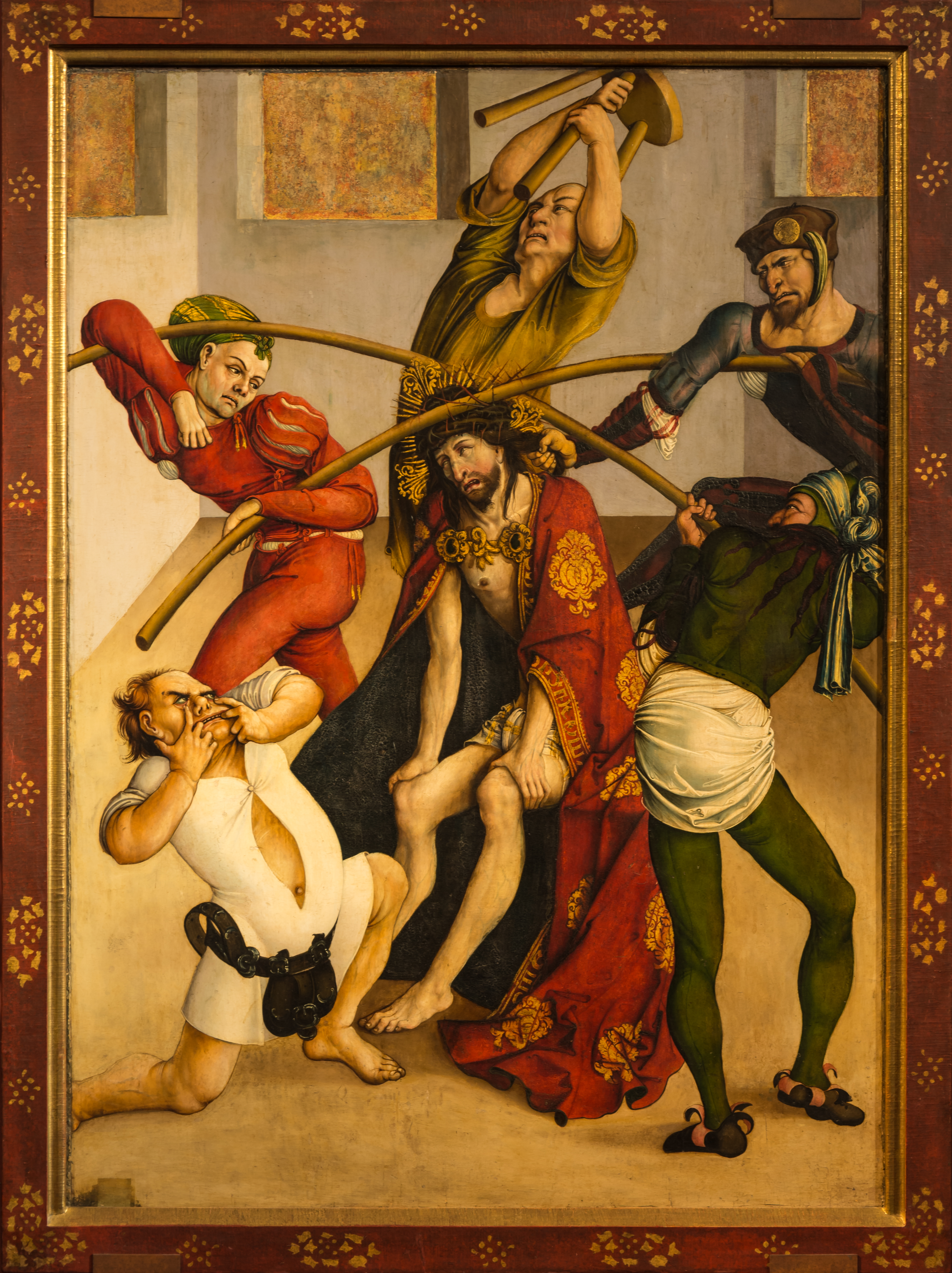
Christ Crowned With Thorns

Jörg Breu the Elder (c. 1475–1537), of Augsburg, was a painter of the German Danube school. He was the son of a weaver.

He journeyed to Austria and created several multi-panel altarpieces there in 1500–02, such as the Melk Abbey altar (1502). He returned to Augsburg in 1502, where he became a master. He travelled to Italy twice, in ca. 1508 and in 1514/15.

After his death in 1537, his son, Jörg Breu the Younger continued to lead his Augsburg workshop until his own death 10 years later.
