= Jörg Breu the Younger =

German painter

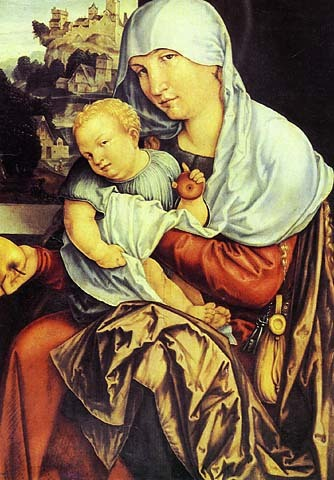
Madonna with child, oil on wood (larch-tree)

Jörg Breu the Younger (c. 1510 – 1547) was a painter of Augsburg. He was the son of Jörg Breu the Elder, and collaborated with his father on some works.

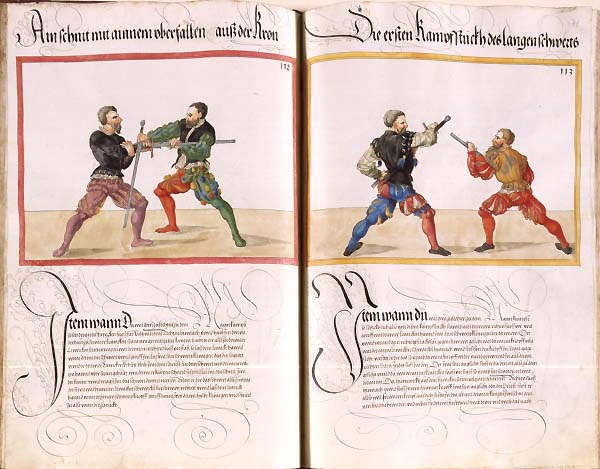
page of a Fechtbuch (Mscr. Dresd. C 93)

In the 1540s, he was involved with the creation of the Fechtbucher commissioned by Paulus Hector Mair. He did also wood carvings Lebenstreppen, together with Cornelis Anthonisz

== Work ==
A selection:

- Das Geheime Ehrenbuch der Fugger
- Madonna with child
- The Dream of Skanderbeg's Mother, 1533.
- Conquest of Rhodos by Queen Artemisia, 1535. Bavarian State Painting Collections}, Munich
- Der reiche Prasser und der arme Lazarus, 1535
- Festival in Venice, 1539
- History of Suzanne, 1540
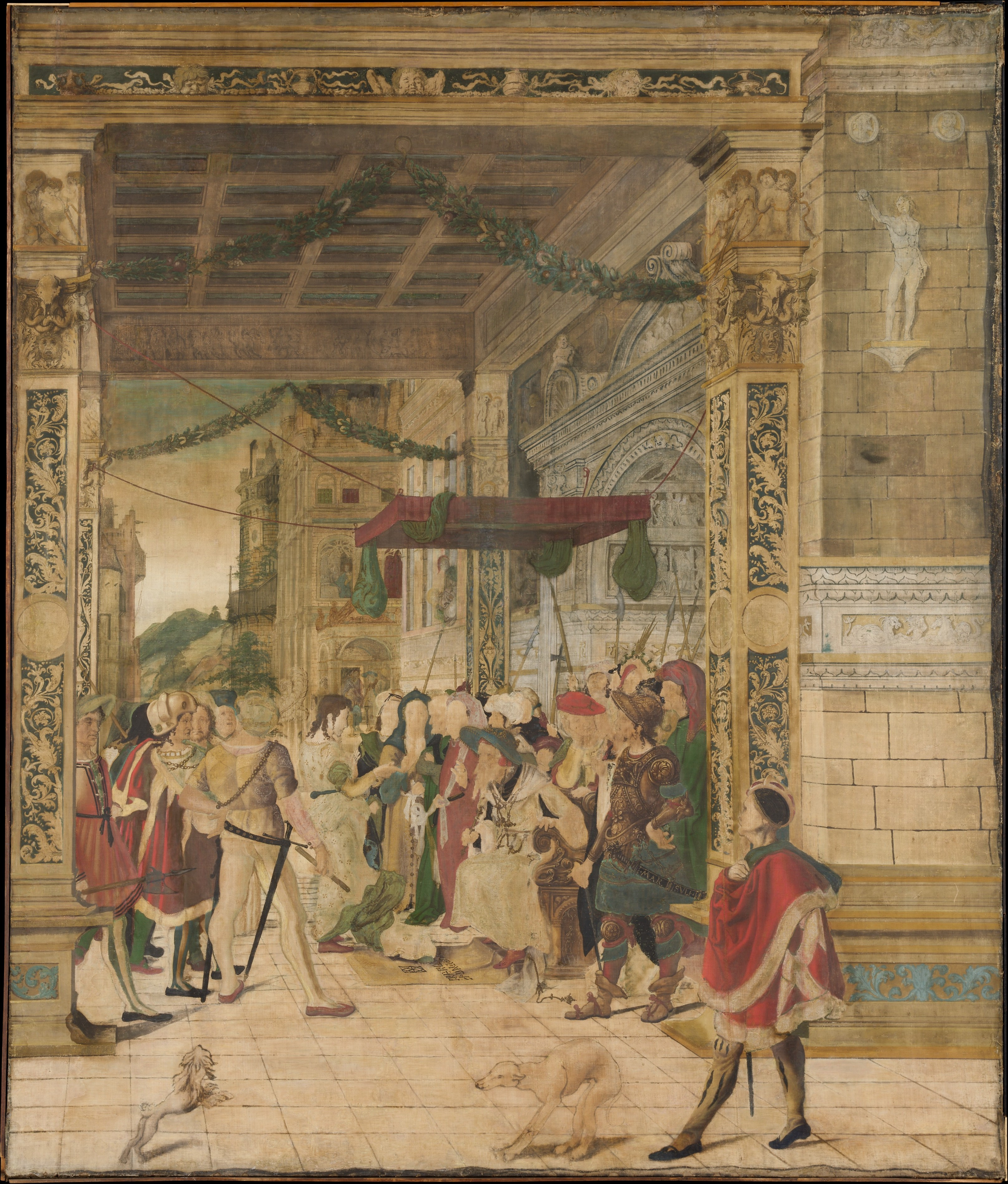
- Joseph Interpreting the Dreams of Pharaoh, c. 1534-1547
  Kaiserl. Schlittenfahrt, vers 1540
- Siege of Algiers, 1541
- Sacrifice of Isaac, 1545
