= Cluny Fechtbuch =

16th century manuscript

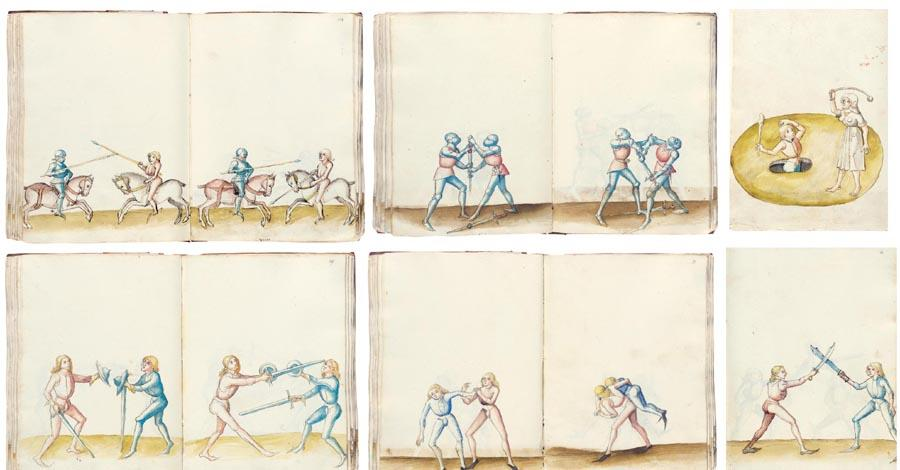
Example images, showing mounted combat, armoured combat, sword and buckler, grappling, großes Messer and a judicial duel

The Cluny Fechtbuch is a South German fechtbuch dating to about 1500. It is influenced by Paulus Kal and Peter Falkner, and was in turn drawn upon by Jorg Wilhalm (1520s).

The manuscript was number 862 in the nineteenth-century Donaueschingen catalogue. It went up for auction at Sotheby's in 2005. It was acquired in 2008 by the Musée National du Moyen Age in Paris, where it was on display as of 2015 with inventory number CL23842.

== Contents ==
- fols. 12r-57v, fencing with the longsword, 92 pictures, 37 of them with captions, showing two young men in combat, one dressed in pale red, one in blue.
- fols. 60r-69v, fighting with großes Messer, 20 pictures, no captions, the same two young men in chivalric combat.
- foll. 72r-87v, fighting with daggers, 32 pictures, one caption, the two young men again.
- foll. 95r-114v, grappling, 40 pictures, no captions, the same two young men demonstrating holds and throws and a hold to immobilise two assailants at once (fol.114v).
- foll. 118r-131v, fighting with a sword and buckler, 28 pictures, no captions.
- foll. 133v-148r,n fighting on horseback, 29 pictures, including competing with lances (fols. 133v-136v), swords (fols.137r-140v), wrestling on horseback (fols. 141r-146r, including wrestling the opponent's horse too), and fighting when one contestant is on horseback and one on the ground (fols. 146v-148r).
- fols. 149r-178v, 58 pictures, armoured combat, two with captions, fols.149r, 150r with lances), mostly with longswords, a scene of wounding on fol. 166r.
- fols. 180r-181v, 4 pictures, no captions, franconian judicial duels with shields and clubs, shields alone, and shield against swiss dagger.
- foll. 183r-191v, miscellaneous combats, 17 pictures, no captions, including poleaxes, maces, shields, battle-axes and lances, some armoured.
- fols. 194r-v, 2 pictures, two men in loincloths with swords, and a woman with a ball on a chain fighting a man with a club standing in a pit (franconian judicial duels).
- fols. 195r-121v, on fighting in full armour, 36 pictures, one caption, fighting with swords but often held from the middle or the other end (a style of fighting known as Gladiatorial, derived from a manuscript now in the Jagellonian library in Cracow, formerly in Berlin; cf. H. Wegener, Miniaturen-Handschriften der Preussischer Staatsbibliothek zu Berlin, Die Deutschen Handschriften bis 1500, V, 1928, pp. 61–2).
