= Folium =

Folium (Latin: folium, "leaf"), plural folia, may refer to

- a leaf of a book: see recto and verso
- Folium of Descartes, an algebraic curve
- Folium (spider), a marking on the abdomen of a spider

== Brain anatomy ==
- Folium (brain)
- Folium vermis

== Botany ==
- Turnsole or folium, a dyestuff
- Folium Phyllostachydis, processed leaves of bamboo
- Hydrangeae Dulcis Folium, processed leaves of hydrangea
