= Dusack =

Dusack, Tessak, Dussägge
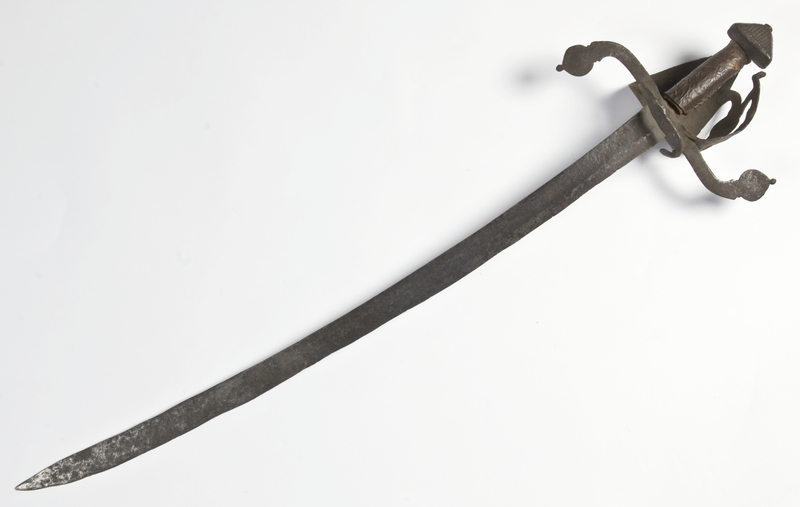
- Tessak – Norway, 16th century
- Type: Sabre
- Place of origin: German Lands

Production history
- Produced: 1560s
- Variants: Hilt Typology A - H

Specifications
- Blade length: 25–38 in (640–970 mm)
- Blade type: curved (occasionally straight)
- Hilt type: thumb ring, half basket, "Sinclair hilt"

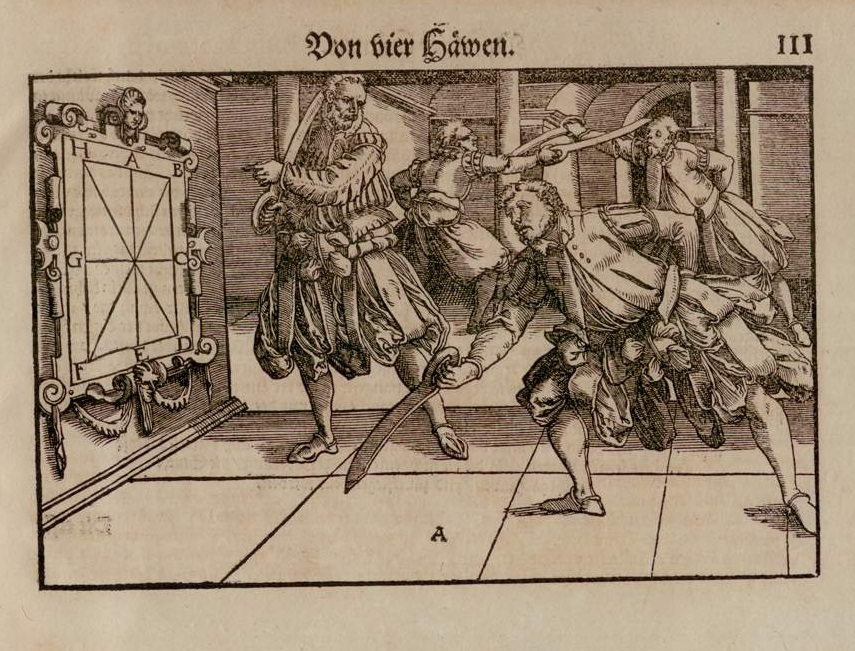
Figure illustrating the basic cuts with the Dusäck in Joachim Meyer's fencing manual; a pair of fencers using the Dusäck is shown in the background (illustration by Tobias Stimmer, 1570).

A dusack or dussack (also dusägge and variants, from Czech tesák "cleaver; hunting sword", lit. "fang") is a single-edged sword of the cutlass or sabre type, in use as a side arm in Germany and the Habsburg monarchy during the 16th to 17th centuries, as well as a practice weapon based on this weapon used in early modern German fencing.

== Military sidearm ==
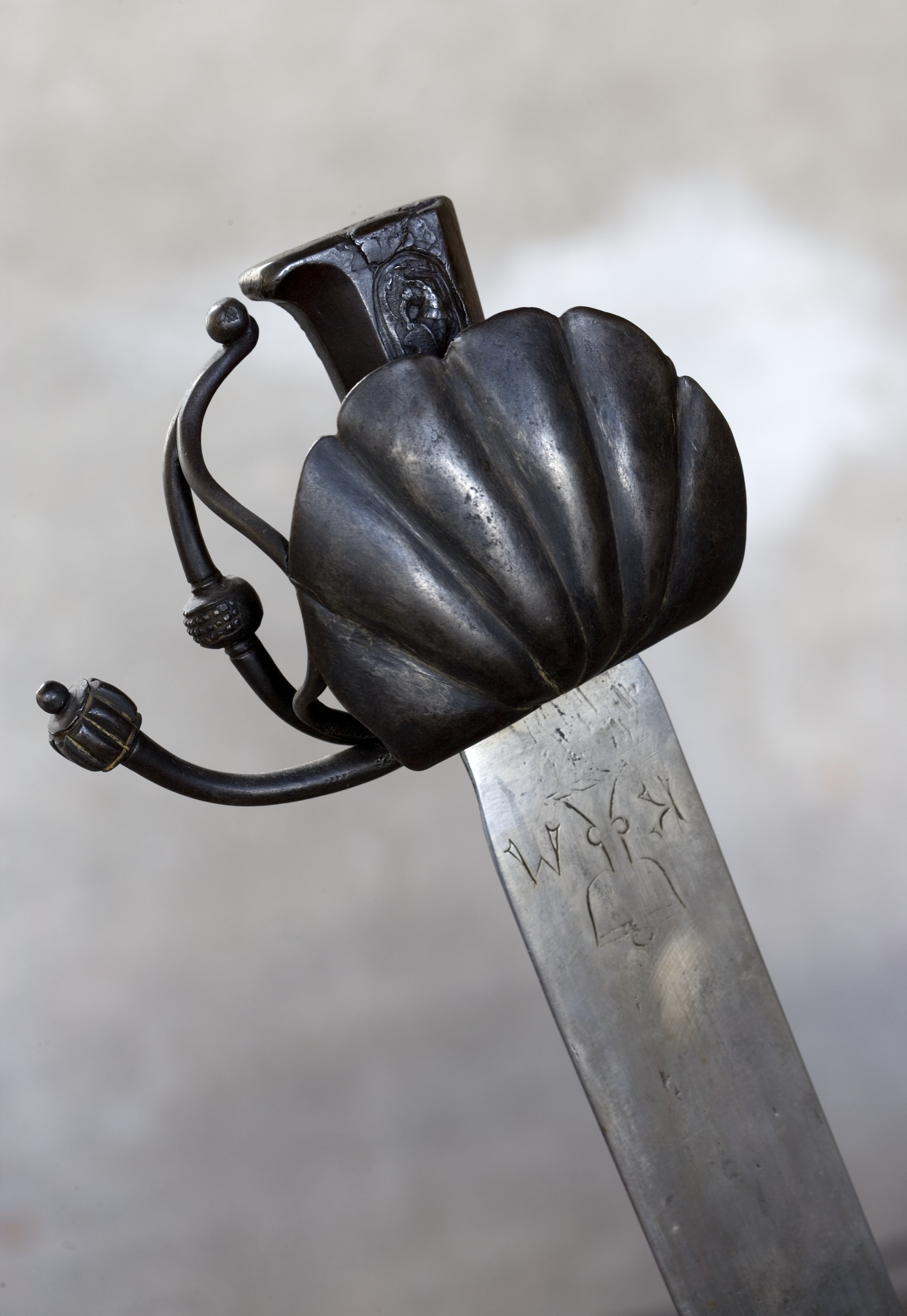
German sabre of the early 17th century, known as "Zisca's sword" (Skokloster Castle, SKO 7300)

The Czech term entered German usage in the Hussite Wars, after the sidearm used by the Hussites. In the late 16th century, Dusägge could refer to a type of weapon combining a sabre blade with the hilt of a sidesword (the German Degen), also known as Säbel auf Teutsch gefasst ("sabre fitted in the German manner"). The Dusägge in this sense was used as a military sidearm; e.g. in 1579, Styria records delivery of some 700 Dusäggen by local bladesmiths, besides payment of 40 Dusäggen delivered from Passau, as part of the preparation for the war against the Turks under Archduke Charles II.

The German sabre together with the name tessak was adopted in Norway. A closely related weapon is the schnepf or Swiss sabre used in Early Modern Switzerland.

== Practice weapon ==
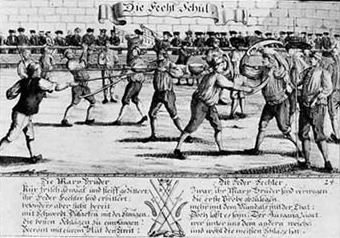
Depiction of a German fencing school, with a pair of fencers using dussaken shown in the foreground right.

Joachim Meyer in 1570 depicts the Dusäck as the practice weapon with broad, curving blade and a simple oval grip. The dussack represented a short, single-edged weapon in a training environment. As usage of the dussack became more widespread, various schools turned use of the dussack into a sport as opposed to training for a real weapon.

Practice dussacks had a short, thick, single-edged blade measuring between 25–38 in (640–970 mm) long. A dussack was usually made of wood. Additionally there is a single reference to dussacks also being made from leather, and there are a small number of simple metal dussacken known to survive. The dussack was gently curved and brought to a point at the tip. The dussack often lacked a hilt. Instead, the handgrip was merely a hole cut inside of the blade; without a pommel or upper guard, it looked something like a large hole for gripping scissors.

Egerton Castle claimed that dussacks were used by the French Navy up through the 19th century.

No wooden (or leather) practice dussacks are known to have survived; unsurprising given the perishable nature of these dussacks, and only woodcuts and training manuals from the period document their existence.

== See also ==
- Falchion
- Sabre
- Katzbalger
- Messer (weapon)
- Basket-hilted sword
- Scythe sword
