= Peter Falkner =

German fencing master

- Occupation: Fencing master
- Writing career
- Notable work: KK 5012

Peter Falkner was a German fencing master, active in the late 15th century (roughly 1470s or 1480s), influenced by Paulus Kal. He is the author of a fechtbuch, now KK 5012, at the Kunsthistorisches Museum, Vienna. He wrote treatises on the usage of longswords, messers, daggers, and on various other weapons of the time period
