= German school of fencing =

South German fencing tradition

German school of historical fencing
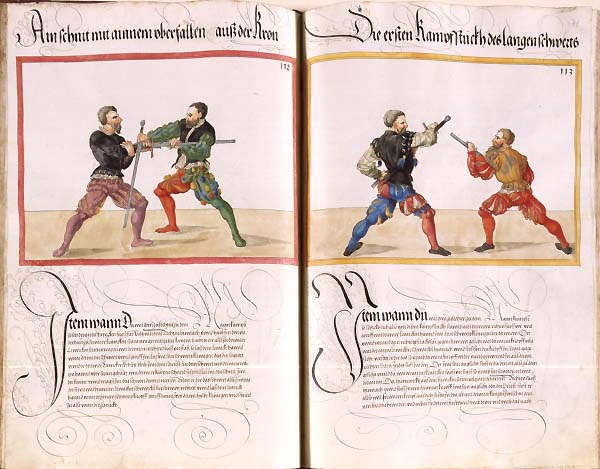
- page of Mscr. Dresd. C 93 by Paulus Hector Mair (1540s)
- Also known as: Historical German swordsmanship, Kunst des Fechtens
- Focus: Longsword, messer, dagger, polearms, grappling
- Country of origin: Holy Roman Empire
- Famous practitioners: Johannes Liechtenauer, Joachim Meyer, Hans Talhoffer, Paulus Hector Mair, Sigmund Ringeck
- Descendant arts: German stage fencing Academic fencing (indirectly) Bayonet fencing (partly)

The German school of fencing (Deutsche Schule; Kunst des Fechtens (Note: The historical term Fechtschule "school of fencing" does not refer to the "German school" but to individual fencing competitions held in the early modern period, equivalent to the English Prize Playings.)) is a system of combat taught in the Holy Roman Empire during the Late Medieval, German Renaissance, and early modern periods. It is described in the contemporary Fechtbücher ("fencing books") written at the time. The geographical center of this tradition was in what is now Southern Germany including Augsburg, Frankfurt, and Nuremberg. During the period in which it was taught, it was known as the Kunst des Fechtens, or the "Art of Fighting". (Note: The Early Modern German fechten translates to the English etymological equivalent, to fight. In Modern German, fechten has come to mean "fencing", but translating fechten as "fencing" in a pre-16th century context is an anachronism; the English verb "to fence" in the sense of "fighting with swords" arises in the 1590s, in Shakespeare, in reference specifically to the Elizabethan Art of Defence.) The German school of fencing focuses primarily on the use of the two-handed longsword; it also describes the use of many other weapons, including polearms, medieval daggers, messers (with or without a buckler), and the staff, as well as describing mounted combat and unarmed grappling (ringen).

Most authors of writings on the system are, or claim to be, in the tradition of the 14th-century master Johannes Liechtenauer. The earliest surviving treatise on Liechtenauer's system is a manuscript dated to possibly the late 14th, or early 15th century, known as Ms. 3227a. More manuscripts survive from the 15th century, and during the 16th century the system was also presented in print, most notably by Joachim Meyer in 1570.

The German tradition was largely eclipsed by the Italian school of rapier fencing by the early 17th century, though practitioners of the German school persisted at least until the end of the 18th century.

Fencing with the German longsword has been a focus of historical European martial arts reconstruction since the late 19th century, when swordsmen such as Alfred Hutton first popularized the pursuit.

== History ==
=== Late medieval tradition ===
The first document of German heritage which shows fencing techniques is the Royal Armouries Ms. I.33, which was written around 1300. The next documents date from approximately a century later, when records of the tradition attributed to the 14th-century master Johannes Liechtenauer begin to appear.

The history of the German school of fencing in the tradition of Liechtenauer spans roughly 250 years, or 8–10 generations of masters (depending on the dating of Liechtenauer) from 1350 to 1600. The earliest source, Ms. 3227a of 1389, mentions a number of masters who are considered peers of Liechtenauer: Hanko Döbringer, Andres Jud, Jost von der Nyssen, and Niklaus Preuss. Martin Hundsfeld and Ott Jud were probably active in the early 15th century, but there is a scarcity of historical sources until the mid-15th century.

The mid-15th century saw the peak and decline of the "Society of Liechtenauer" under Peter von Danzig, Sigmund Ringeck, and Paulus Kal. Kal's contemporary, Hans Talhoffer, may have been involved with the founding of the Brotherhood of St. Mark, which enjoyed a quasi-monopoly on teaching martial arts from 1487 until 1570.

In 1514, Emperor Maximilian L. gave special privileges to both the Marksbrüder and much later to the Federfechter, and propagated the fencing style of Liechtenauer in the entire Holy Roman Empire (it became de facto the dominant martial arts within the Holy Roman Empire, despite the fact that there were other martial art schools active in the Empire at the time). The Emperor also granted students the right to bear arms and allowed them to have duels.

=== German Renaissance ===
Late 15th-century masters include Johannes Lecküchner, Hans von Speyer, Peter Falkner, and Hans Folz. In the 16th century, the tradition became more a sporting exercise than a system of combat for duelling or the battlefield. Early 16th-century masters include Hans Wurm, Jörg Wilhalm, and Andre Pauernfeindt (also Paurnfeindt; Paurnfeyndt; Paurenfeyndt). (Note: The occasional spelling Paurñfeyndt is due to a misinterpretation of the siglum indicating en as "ñ" and should be replaced by Paurenfeyndt. The modern form of the surname is Bauernfeind.)

In 1516, Pauernfeindt published a treatise entitled Ergründung der ritterlichen kunst des fechtens durch freyfechter czu Vienn ("Foundation of the knightly art of combat by the Freifechter of Vienna"), which is one of the earliest printed fencing manuals. Comparisons with descriptions in other manuscripts from the period (such as the Cologne Fechtbuch) confirm that this period was a transitional stage between the late medieval school of Johannes Liechtenauer and the German Renaissance "sportive" Federfechten as practiced in the late 16th century (as recorded in the later printed manuals by Joachim Meyer and others). A later manuscript, dated 1564 and attributed to Lienhart Sollinger, cites Pauernfeindt and is largely identical in content. (Note: However, the Kunst des Fechtens could still be used for self-defense and never really became a fully combat sport. The term Versportlichung (the term describes the change from a combat system into a martial sport) as a mitigation of the fight sequences first appeared in the late 18th century, when fencing, mostly took place with the small sword. See "Wir lernen Fechten" [We Learn Fencing] (PDF). 2012. Archived from the original (PDF) on 13 August 2012.)

In the mid 16th century, the first attempts, notably by Paulus Hector Mair, at preserving and reconstructing the teachings of the past century appeared. The foundation of the Federfechter in 1570 at Vienna falls into this late period. The final phase of the tradition stretches from the late 16th to the early 17th century, with masters such as Joachim Meyer and Jakob Sutor.

=== Decline of the German tradition ===
In the 17th century, rapier fencing of the Italian school became fashionable due to treatises by such as Salvator Fabris, and the German tradition becoming regarded as old-fashioned and unrefined among the nobility during the Baroque. Longsword fencing was gradually discontinued at noble fencing schools, including most universities, at the time. The rapier had an advantage in that it could be worn well with the clothing of that time period when longswords were typically seen as too large to be worn fashionably. Thirty Years' War also led to a massive decline of both fencing schools and practitioners in the Holy Roman Empire. Both Peter Hagendorf (a mercenary who fought in the Thirty Years' War) and Hans Jakob Christoffel von Grimmelshausen make references in their works to the excessive number of deaths among the member of the traditional fencing guilds and the massive destruction of the regions in which they were active (this also explains why most of the surviving schools and lines were active in the eastern part of the Holy Roman Empire or in regions that were far less affected by the war).

Author Jean Daniel L'Ange writes in his book Deutliche und gründliche Erklärung der adelichen und ritterlichen freyen Fecht-Kunst, from 1664 (another edition was published in 1708), that "a big sword is very dangerous in our times because it is more difficult to [carry] around with clothing than a smaller thrusting sword, which can easily be worn." He also writes that "it is possible to kill a man who is armed with a gun in a short range, when he stands close to you[,] with the help of the rapier, because of the highly effective thrusting techniques [that] will save your life, rather than with the slower cutting of a bigger sword or a sabre. You may even be able to kill him, before he can take his gun out of its halter, before he can make the first shot".

L'Ange also writes, "you can hide your rapier well under your mantle and thus avoid any provocation in public. A long sword may cause problems and excite enemies". But L'Ange also pays tribute to the Marksbrüder and states, "their art is truly a knightly science, it must be preserved for the coming, yet unborn generations!". However, some civilian fencers still practiced the German school instead of the rapier-fencing of the noble elite. The last known practitioner by name was Theodori Verolini in 1679, when he published his book Der Kůnstliche Fechter ("The Artful Fencer"), which was based upon Joachim Meyers fechtbuch.

=== Late survivals in the modern period ===
There are paintings from the middle of the 18th century that show practitioners still using long swords in the fencing schools of the Marxbrüder and Federfechter. It cannot be verified if these depictions are anachronistic or they show techniques and practices of the original Liechtenauer tradition still in use, although it is highly likely that most 18th century fencers were not at all familiar with longsword fencing and would likely not have known how to handle these weapons, which indicates that these pictures show lines of the Liechtenauer tradition that are referred in literature (and did continue to exist at least until the end of the 18th century / the early 19th century).

In 1726, Gottfried Rudolf Pommer auf Bugenhagen mentions, in his publication Sammlung von Merktwurdigkeiten ("Collection of Oddities"), the use of long swords in those fencing schools. Most fencers of the 18th century viewed longsword fencing as a curious thing, and it was probably only taught in the few remaining fencing schools of the Marxbrüder and Federfechter and in some stage fencing schools. There is an illustration of a fencing school from 1726, where *Fechtfedern* (two-handed training swords) are being used and Huten of Liechtenauer's school of fencing are recognizable. This portrayal is compatible with the contemporary sources which refer to longsword fencing in the existing fencing schools of the 18th century in the Holy Roman Empire. Author and historian Joseph Ott notices that the longsword survived the rapier in the fencing schools of the Marksbrüder in the 18th century. The rapier was replaced by the smaller smallsword during the late 17th century and the foil became a fashionable training weapon in the 18th century, however both fencing with the longsword and the Dusack was till being taught in the fencing schools of the Marksbrüder.

German historian Johann Büsching mentioned the existence of both the Brotherhood of St. Mark and the Federfechter as well as the existence of "Klopffechter" (artistic and stage fencers who used blunt weapons) as late as 1735. He further stated that there were alive in 1817 at least a handful of skilled people who knew how to use "battle swords" ("Schlachtschwerter", another name for either longswords or Zweihänder). Büsching goes on to say that the art was dying out very slowly, mostly due to the fact that there were fewer living fencers who were trained by the few remaining Marxbrüder und Federfechter.

The last of public displays of longsword fencing was on 5 November 1741, the author clearly mentions the use of "Schlachtenschwerter" ("battle swords"). The most prominent guest of one of the last of these displays was the young Francis I., holy Roman Emperor who enjoyed the presentation very much. Strangely enough, the public demonstrations of these fencing styles seem to end very abruptly, despite the big popularity they had among both noblemen and common citizens.

Some historians assume that it was the collapse of the Holy Roman Empire which directly led to the end and eventual extinction of its unique fencing culture, because the downfall of the Empire did also destroy much of its oldest institutions and practices.

The collapse of the Holy Roman Empire, in 1806, and the wars and battles of the period destroyed several of the remaining old fencing schools and led to the death of many active fencers. It is possible that the Napoleonic wars brought an end to most of the remaining lines of the Liechtenauer tradition.

Another source mentions living longsword fencers who were alive in 1819, but who were "without any fencing schools" (a reference to the decline of both the Federfechter and the Marksbrüder).

The German historian Alfred Schaer presented evidence that longsword fencing was referenced in descriptions and even portrayed on images of the Marksbrüder and the Federfechter as long as these institutions existed. He makes the argument that longsword fencing was such an integral part of the tradition of these imperial institutions that they stubbornly clung to it, even centuries after longsword fencing had lost its relevancy for battles or judicial duels.

The last practitioners of longsword fencing may have ceased activity with the dissolution of the Marxbrüder and Federfechter by the early 19th century.

On 16 April 1862, the Swiss newspaper Neue Zürcher Zeitung mentioned the death of an unnamed, 76-year-old (born in 1786) former member of the Marksbrüder, who, having fenced longsword in his teenage years in the early 1800s, was possibly the last living practitioner.

The last known source who mentions living members of the Marksbrüder is the "Jagd-Zeitung" ("Hunting Newspapers") part 9 from 1866. The author Jos Baader, mentions living veterans of the old fencing schools who were still alive but very old (he mentions a gentleman who is in his late 80s, but was once a practitioner of their specific longsword fencing style).

There were some living German longsword fencers alive during the lifetime of Alfred Hutton, a British fencer of the 19th century who was interested into the reconstruction of old fencing systems. Hutton could have met some living longsword fencers and interviewed them. He could have preserved at least a part of their knowledge, if he had been to Germany and met the last living Marksbrüder members.

Some aspects and basics—such as the Huten, the basic four guards of the Liechtenauer traditions, and some terminology (terms such as "Schrankhut" and "Langort" can still be found in rare German stage fencing literature of the 19th and early 20th centuries), as well as the four basic cuts and the thrusts from all guards of medieval German longsword fencing—survived in some classic German stage fencing schools ("Bühnenfechtkunst") at least until the middle of the 20th century.

The close relationship between longsword fencers of the Liechtenauer tradition and stage fencers can be traced back at least until the medieval period.

During the time of the Third Reich, there was an interest among certain members of the NSDAP to conserve classical German stage fencing and to teach specifically longsword fencing techniques to young boys who were in the Hitlerjugend, under the name "Ritterspiele" ("Knightly Games").

Wilhelm Fabricius (1894–1989), a silviculture scientist and passionate admirer of historical martial arts and fencing even wanted to reconstruct German medieval fencing on the basis of traditional stage fencing and the Fechtbuch of Joachim Meyer. Fabricius was later captured by American troops, it is unclear whether or not he continued his reconstruction efforts after the war, although there is evidence that his interest in the subject never faded. The last references and active lines of these techniques in classical German stage fencing vanished almost entirely with the second world war.

After the war, Germans started to vastly prefer modern American stage fencing (which was a mix between 19th century saber fencing and some East Asian martial arts techniques), probably due to the popularity of Hollywood movies in Germany after the second world war. Classical German stage fencing became more and more rare and its practitioners started to die out. As of 2018, almost all of the practitioners of this classical style of stage fencing either have died or would be very old.

Today, the only surviving part of the medieval German school of fencing can be found in modern German Academic fencing, where some of the old terminologies (for example: swords are divided into parts called "Stärke" and "Schwäche", the term "Anhauen" and the saying "in die Schranken weisen" are directly descended from the medieval German fencing terminology of the Liechtenauer canon) and traditions (such as the unbroken line of German Fencing masters which reaches back to the medieval period) are still active.

=== Influence on modern bayonet fencing ===
Bayonets (daggers or short swords which were mounted on the barrels of the muskets) were first introduced in either France or Germany in the 16th century and became commonly used in the 17th century (especially during the Thirty Years' War. Johann Georg Pascha, a passionate fencer, was one of the most popular and prominent bayonet fencing masters of the time (though no bayonet fencing book of his seemingly has survived, his books about shooting however still exist). Pascha himself seemingly based large parts of his own combat system on existing fencing schools (his book about Kampfringen makes direct references to Liechtenauer's fencing style). The earliest surviving fencing manual about bayonet fencing is most likely Pierre Francois Giffart 's "L' Art Militaire Françoise Pour L'Infanterie" (1697), while written in French, was from a German author. Giffart directly references "thrusting with a longsword" and compares his own bayonet fencing system with "the handling of a large sword" (" épée-grande").

The 17th century military expert Johann Jacobi von Wallhausen describes that longsword fencing was in large parts used as a basis for both fencing with the pike as well as bayonet fencing and the soldier and experienced shootist D.M.B.G.L compares close combat with the bayonet directly with halfsword techniques from Liechtenauer's tradition. German schools of bayonet fencing later became more prominent throughout Europe and even influenced both French as well as Anglo-Saxon bayonet fencing systems. Julius Friedrich, Duke of Württemberg argues that German bayonet fencing has its roots both in "wrestling as well as the traditional fencing school" (he most likely references Liechtenauer's school of fencing, which was considered to be the indigenous school of fencing of Germany at the time).

Despite the German fencing school's decline since the 16th century, its basics, techniques, movements and tactics remained powerful and influential in bayonet fencing as well as pike and polearm combat and was spread slowly across many different European countries. The Hews "Pflug", "Langort" and "Schlüssel" seem to have been considered the best guards and there were still references to their roots in older, medieval fencing styles as late as the 19th century.

While there were other bayonet fencing systems (some which were based on saber fencing - like in the case of Sir Alfred Hutton's bayonet system - or smallsword fencing), there remained an influence of older, pike and longsword-based methods well into the 20th century. William Ewart Fairbairn's "All-in Fighting" still makes references to the older bayonet fencing systems and ignores the 19th century systems which used saber-based guards, attacks and parries. Especially noteworthy is the bayonet fencing system of American soldier John Styers, which uses the same basics as Liechtenauer's system and - like Fairbairn's system - completely ignores the 19th century schools in favor of a more traditional method of bayonet fencing. Like Liechtenauer's system, Styers' method doesn't have parries, but uses bladework to focus the enemy weapon away from its original target and provide openings for the fencer to attack. The similarities were so obvious that historian Hortst Ueberhorst referenced them in his publication about physical exercises.

== Spread ==
The geographical origin of the tradition of Liechtenauer is difficult to establish. There are several places called "Lichtenau" in Germany, and Ms. 3227a states explicitly that Johannes Liechtenauer traveled widely to learn from as many masters as possible. Of course, it is to be assumed that there were traditions of combat training throughout the medieval world, in spite of the absence of evidence of their details. What is now known as the "German school" comprises those traditions which were put on paper in the late medieval period, and this tradition of compiling written manuals or epitomes of fighting systems appears to mostly have been confined to Southern Germany. From about the same time, early records of the Italian school of fencing document the German school, beginning with the writings of Fiore dei Liberi, who mentions a master of Swabia called Johannes "who was a student of Nicholai of Toblem."

After the medieval period, emerging traditions of fencing, i.e. the early modern rapier systems, as opposed to the generic systems of "combat" or "fighting" of the late medieval period, developed in close contact with each other, which led to the separate but closely related rapier styles of Italy, Spain, and later France, all of which were also well received in Germany. For example: Paulus Hector Mair describes a Spanish style of rapier fencing in his book on fencing.

The 15th century Liechtenauerian tradition seems to have been geographically centered on Swabia and Franconia, and influenced development in the adjacent territories, including Alsace, the Rhineland, the Lowlands, Bohemia, and the Swiss Confederacy. In the 16th century, there was an established tradition of Federfechten competitions. The dominant guild were the Brotherhood of St. Mark which held their annual meeting in Frankfurt. After 1570, there was a second influential guild, the Federfechter, which apparently originated in the southeastern part of the empire (Prague, Vienna). Masters or treatises of the period that can be located geographically include:

- the oldest surviving manual, Royal Armouries Ms. I.33 of c. 1300, originates in Franconia
- the oldest record of the Liechtenauerian tradition, Nürnberger Handschrift GNM 3227a, appears to exhibit East Central German dialectal elements. By 1495, this manuscript had been acquired by Nicolaus Pol of Innsbruck
- Hans Talhoffer, in the 1440s to 1460s, was active throughout Southern Germany, including Königsegg, Emerkingen, and Zürich
- Johannes Lecküchner was active in Nuremberg in the 1460s; Hans Folz also was in Nuremberg in the late 15th to early 16th century. Albrecht Dürer compiled a manual on grappling in c.1505.
- Cgm 558, written in what is now Switzerland, most likely the Toggenburg, shortly before 1500.
- the Cologne Fechtbuch of Cologne or surroundings, c.1510.
- Christian Egenolph of Frankfurt was active in the 1520s
- Paulus Hector Mair of Augsburg was active in the 1540s. Jörg Wilhalm was also in Augsburg, active during the 1540s to 1560s.
- Joachim Meyer was active in the 1570s in Strasbourg.

Karl Ludwig Blum mentioned that there were traveling masters, who gave lectures to noblemen in the Grand Duchy of Moscow in 1505.

In spite of the surging popularity of the Italian and Spanish rapier, elements of the German tradition survived well into the 17th century. Even in 1614, many fencing masters based their fighting styles on the tradition. An example is would-be master Joachim Meyer, who based his early rapier fencing on Lichtenauers principles, which was considered to be the most effective and efficient school of fencing. There is evidence that, in the second half of the 16th century, at least a handful of German long sword fencers (Marksbrüder) traveled to England and gave fencing lessons. Frederic Hervey said that "the Imperial German fencers came to Britain to teach their Anglo-Saxon brethren the old and knightly art of fencing". However, it can be assumed that few fencers in Britain received such training. One source mentions a "nobleman named Alberth", from Britain, who was experienced in the German school of longsword fencing, and who was also trained in a Spanish school of swordsmanship, either an early rapier-fencing school of La Verdadera Destreza or a surviving Spanish Medieval school of fencing). Although the German school of fencing was mostly distributed in the Holy Roman Empire, there are hints of practitioners even in Greece, Spain and Scandinavia. The German fencing master Konrad Ditzefeldberg stated in the late 16th century: "the noble art of Liechtenauer may be at home in the (Holy Roman) Empire, but everywhere in Christendom you can find adherents and adepts of the art!". In 1646, the young King Louis XIV of France was entertained by longsword fencers at a party (the sources specifically mention the swords as "alte, zweihändige Schlachtenschwerter", in English: "old, two handed battle swords"). One German source states: "the young prince (Louis XIV) was very excited by the stage fencing provided by fencers from his mother's fatherland. When they were finished with the swordplay, he (Louis XIV) clapped loudly and asked for more (stage fights and friendly bouts)" (Note: Anne of Austria, the mother of Louis, was a Spanish princess from the Holy Roman Empire, given that the Liechtenauer tradition was both the most widely practiced and officially recognised form of fencing in the Holy Roman Empire, it is very likely that these fencers were practitioners of the Liechtenauer tradition).

== Disciplines ==
Master Johannes Liechtenauer based his system of fencing upon the use of the Longsword. He used this weapon to exemplify several overarching martial principles that also apply to other disciplines within the tradition. Ringen (wrestling/grappling) was taught, as well as fighting with the messer, and staff. Also part of the curriculum was fighting with the dagger Degen (mainly the roundel dagger) and with polearms. Two other disciplines besides Blossfechten involved the sword: fencing with (single-handed) sword and buckler (or a large shield in the case of judicial combat according to Swabian law), and armored fighting (Harnischfechten), the latter reserved only for nobility.

== First principles ==
Johannes Liechtenauer's teachings as recorded in 3227a are introduced by some general principles (foll. 13–17). The anonymous author explicitly states that Liechtenauer had cast his teaching in opaque verses intended to hide their meaning from the uninitiated. He stressed that there is "only a single art of the sword" which had been the same for centuries and which is the kernel and foundation of all arts of combat.

- the principle of taking the shortest and most direct line of attack (of das aller neheste vnd kors körtzste / slecht vnd gerade czu) disregarding flourishes or flashy parrying techniques (mit dem höbschen paryrn vnd weit vmefechten).
- the difficulty of explaining techniques in words and the importance of direct instruction and intensive training, offering the aphorism that "exercise is better than art, because exercise without art is useful, but art without exercise is useless" (15r).
- the importance of footwork and stance (15v) and of correct distance (mosse, 15v) and speed of motion (16r)
- the importance of taking the offensive (vorslag, 14v, 16r-16v) with a fixed plan of attack
- the tactical importance of hiding the intended action from the opponent (16r)

The text goes on to present the core principles of successful swordsmanship in eight rhyming couplets (17v):

1. the help of God	Czu allem fechten / gehört dy hölfe gotes von rechte
2. a healthy body and a good weapon	Gerader leip vnd gesvnder / eyn gancz vertik swert pesundr
3. the principles of offensive and defensive and of hard and soft	Vor noch swach sterke / yndes das wort mete czu merken
4.-5. a list of basic techniques (discussed below)	Hewe stiche snete drücken / leger schütczen stöße fülen czücken Winden vnd hengen / rücken striche sprönge greiffen ringen
6. speed and courage paired with wariness, deceit and cleverness	Rascheit vnd kunheit / vorsichtikeit list vnd klugheit
7. correct distance, concealing one's intentions, reason, anticipation and dexterity	Masse vörborgenheit / vernunft vorbetrachtunge fertikeit
8. training and confidence, speed, agility and good footwork	Vbunge vnd guter mut / motus gelenkheit schrete gut

A characteristic, introductory verse of Liechtenauer's – often repeated in later manuscripts – echoes classic 14th century chivalry, addressing the student as "young knight" (jung ritter):

(fol 18r) Jung Ritter lere / got lip haben frawen io ere / So wechst dein ere / Uebe ritterschaft und lere / kunst dy dich zyret und in krigen sere hofiret
"Young knight, learn to love God and revere noble ladies, so that your honour grows. Practice knighthood and learn the art that dignifies you, and brings you honour in wars."

== Unarmoured longsword ==
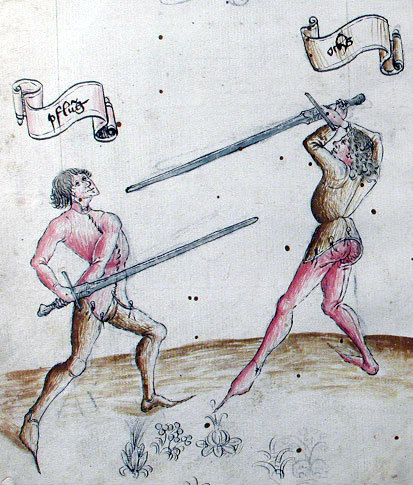
pflug and ochs, as shown on fol. 1r of Cod. 44 A 8 (1452)

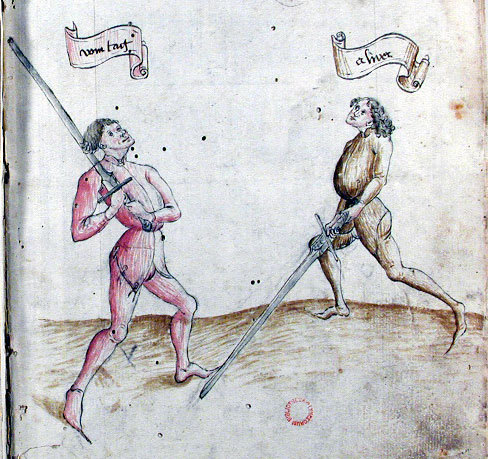
fol. 2r, showing vom tag and alber

The principal discipline is unarmoured fencing with the longsword (Blossfechten).

The foundation of the system comprises five "master-hews" (Meisterhäue) or "hidden hews" from which many masterful techniques arise, 12 "chief pieces" (hauptstücke) that categorize the main components of the art, and five words (fünf Wörter) dealing with concepts of timing and leverage.

At the center of the art is an emphasis on swiftness, as well as on balance and good judgement:

(fol. 20r) vor noch swach stark Indes / an den selben woertern leit alle kunst / meister lichtnawers / Und sint dy gruntfeste und der / kern alles fechtens czu fusse ader czu rosse / blos ader in harnuesche

"'Before', 'after', 'weak', 'strong', Indes ('meanwhile'), on these five words hinges the entire art of master Lichtenauer, and they are the foundation and the core of all combat, on foot or on horseback, unarmoured or armoured."

The terms "before" (vor) and "after" (nach) correspond to offensive and defensive actions. While in the vor, one dictates his opponent's actions and thus is in control of the engagement, while in the nach, one responds to the decisions made by his opponent. Under Liechtenauer's system, a combatant must always strive to be in control of the engagement—that is, in the vor. "Strong" (stark) and "weak" (swach) relate to the amount of force that is applied in a bind, or contact, of the swords. Here, neither is better than the other, but one needs to counter the opponent's action with a complementary reaction; strength is countered with weakness, and weakness with strength. Indes means "meanwhile" or "interim", referring to the time it takes for the opponent to complete an action. At the instant of contact with the opponent's blade, an experienced fencer uses "feeling" (fühlen) to immediately sense his opponent's pressure in order to know whether he should be "weak" or "strong" against him. He then either attacks on the vor or remains in the bind until his opponent acts, depending on what he feels is right. When his opponent starts to act, the fencer acts indes (meanwhile) and regains the vor before the opponent can finish his action.

What follows is a list of technical terms of the system (with rough translation; they should each be explained in a separate section):

=== Range ===
Some of the later practitioners of the German school of fencing, such as Theodori Verolini, started to use the term Mensur (measure) in the 17th century to explain the different ranges of the art of fencing.

- Weite Mensur (wide measure) the attacker has to make two footsteps to reach his opponent with his weapon.
- Mittlere Mensur (middle measure) the attacker has to make one footstep to reach the other combatant with the blade.
- Nahe Mensur (near measure) the attacker can cut or thrust his enemy without having to make any footsteps.
- Enge Mensur (close measure) the attacker and his opponent are so close that they are able to reach the other person with their hands. Most of the wrestling-techniques (Ringen am Schwert) can only be used in the close measure.

=== Basic attacks ===
Liechtenauer and other German masters describe three basic methods of attack with the sword. They are sometimes called drei wunder, "three wounders", with a deliberate pun on "three wonders."

- Hauen, "hews": A hewing stroke with one of the edges of the sword.
  - Oberhau, "over hew": A stroke delivered from above the attacker.
  - Mittelhau, "middle hew": A stroke delivered from side to side.
  - Unterhau, "under hew": A stroke delivered from below the attacker.
- Stechen, "stabbing": A thrusting attack made with the point of the sword.
- Abschneiden, "slicing off": Slicing attacks made with the edge of the sword by placing the edge against the body of the opponent and then pushing or pulling the blade along it.

=== Master-Hews (Meisterhäue) ===
Called "five hews" in 3227a, later "hidden hews," and in late manuals "master hews", these likely originated as secret surprise attacks in Liechtenauer's system, but with the success of Liechtenauer's school, they may have become common knowledge. All five are attacks from the first phase of the fight (zufechten) and are long range, accompanied by triangular stepping.

- Zornhau: "wrath-hew"

A powerful diagonal hewing stroke dealt from the vom Tag guard that ends in the Wechsel guard on the opposite side. When a Zornhau is used to displace (Versetzen) another oberhau, the impact and binding of the blades will result in the hew ending in a lower hanging at the center of the body. This strike is normally thrown to the opponent's upper opening.

- Krumphau: "crooked-hew"

A vertical hew from above that reaches across the direct line to the opponent, traveling left from a right position and vice versa. Krumphau is almost always accompanied with a wide diagonal sideways step. The Krumphau breaks the guard Ochs.

- Zwerchhau, or Twerhau: "thwart-hew"

A high horizontal hew, with the short (backhand) edge when thrown from the right side and with the long edge when thrown from the left side. The Zwerchau breaks the guard vom Tag.

- Schielhau: "squinting-hew"

A short edge (backhand) hew dealt from the vom Tag guard that ends in an upper hanger on the opposite side and usually targets the head or the right shoulder. It is basically a twist from vom Tag to opposite side Ochs with one step forward, striking simultaneously downwards with the short edge. The Schielhau breaks both the Pflug and Langen Ort guards and can be used to counter-hew against a powerful Oberhau.

- Scheitelhau: "part-hew"

A vertical descending hew that ends in the guard Alber. This hew is dealt to the opponent's upper openings, most often to the opponent's head, where the hair parts (hence the name of the hew). Through the principle of überlauffen, "overrunning" or "overreaching", a Scheitelhau is used to break the guard Alber.

=== Guards (also known as huten or leger) ===
Basic Guards

- Tag: "of the day"

a basic position with the sword held either on the right shoulder or above the head. The blade can be held vertically or at roughly 45-degrees. An alternative spelling, "tach" or "dach" in modern German, is often translated as "roof" or "day".

- Ochs: "ox"

a position with the sword held to either side of the head, with the point (as a horn) aiming at the opponent's face.

- Pflug: "plough"

a position with the sword held to either side of the body with the pommel near the back hip, with the point aiming at the opponent's chest or face. Some historical manuals state that when this guard is held on the right side of the body that the short edge should be facing up and when held on the left side of the body the short edge should be facing down with the thumb on the flat of the blade.

- Alber: "fool"

In the Fool's Guard, the point of the sword is lowered to the ground, appearing to "foolishly" expose the upper parts of the body and inviting an attack. Although the Fool's Guard exposes the upper openings, it does provide excellent protection to the lower openings. From the Fool's Guard an attack or displacement can be made with the false edge of the sword, or the hilt of the sword can be quickly raised into a hanging parry.

Additional Guards: Liechtenauer is emphatic that the above four guards are sufficient, and all guards taught by other masters may be derived from them. Later masters introduce richer terminology for variant guards:

- Zornhut: "wrath guard"
- Wechsel: "change"
- Nebenhut: "near guard" or "side guard"
- Eisenport: "iron door", mentioned in 3227a as a non-Liechtenauerian ward, identical to the porta di ferro of the Italian school
- Schlüssel: "key"
- Einhorn: "unicorn", a variant of Ochs
- Schrankhut: "barrier guard"

The following are transitional stances that are not properly called guards:

- Hengetort: "hanging point"
- Kron: "crown", the sword hilt is held out about head height with the point up. Kron is used at the bind and is usually a prelude to grappling.
- Langort: "long point", the sword point is extended straight out at the opponent. Many of the cuts pass through this transitional guard, and it is the natural ending of a thrust.

=== Techniques ===
Other terms in Liechtenauer's system (most of them referring to positions or actions applicable in mid-combat, when the blades are in contact) include:

- Duplieren: "doubling", the immediate redoubling of a displaced hew.
- Mutieren: "mutating", change of attack method, changing a displaced hew into a thrust, or a displaced thrust into a hew.
- Versetzen: "displacement" or "parrying" (upper/lower, left/right), to parry an attack with one's own weapon.
- Nachreisen: "after-traveling", the act of attacking an opponent after he has pulled back to attack, or an attack after the opponent has missed, or an attack following the opponent's action.
- Überlaufen: "over-running" or "overrunning", the act of countering a hew or thrust made from below with an attack from above; a slight step backward usually accompanies the attack, the higher blow out-ranging the lower one.
- Absetzen: "off-setting", deflecting a thrust or hew at the same time as stabbing.
- Durchwechseln: "changing-through", name for various techniques of escaping a bind by sliding the sword's point out from underneath the blade and then stabbing to another opening.
- Zucken: "tugging", a technique used in a strong bind between blades in which a combatant goes weak in the bind so as to disengage his blade from the bind and stabs or hews to the other side of the other combatant's blade. This technique is based upon the concept of using weakness against strength.
- Durchlauffen: "running-through", a technique by which one combatant "runs through" his opponent's attack to initiate grappling with him.
- Händedrücken: "pressing of hands", the execution of an Unterschnitt ("undercut") followed by an Oberschnitt ("overcut") such that the wrists of the opponent are sliced all the way around.
- Hängen: "hanging" (upper/lower, left/right)
- Winden: "Winding", the combatant moves the strong side of his blade to the weak side of the opponent's blade to gain leverage while keeping his point online with the opponent's opening. There are eight variations.

=== Footwork ===
The Fechtbücher themselves rarely if ever mention complex footwork, which caused a debate among historians whether or not there was complex footwork in Liechtenauer's system. However, the fencing master Hugo Wittenwiler strongly implies that "fancy footwork" was seen as impractical and even dangerous in the medieval and early modern period. Fencing master Joachim Meyer later added Italian-inspired footwork to his style of longsword fencing in the late 16th century (techniques such as the "Ausfall", the lunge, which was seemingly unknown or unused in contemporary German swordsmanship of the time. Paulus Hector Mair makes no mention of it in his Fechtbuch which is also from the 16th century. Mair was a contemporary of Mayer).

- The passing step: moving the rear foot in front while following with the behind one, all while transferring weight and stability from one foot to the other.
- The gathering step: a quick movement with the forward foot while the backfoot stabilizes the fast momentum by being focused sideways.
- The offline step: this step begins by moving forward, making a tilt, moving slight backward movement and then attacking with the strong side of the other foot.

== Armoured combat (Harnischfechten) ==
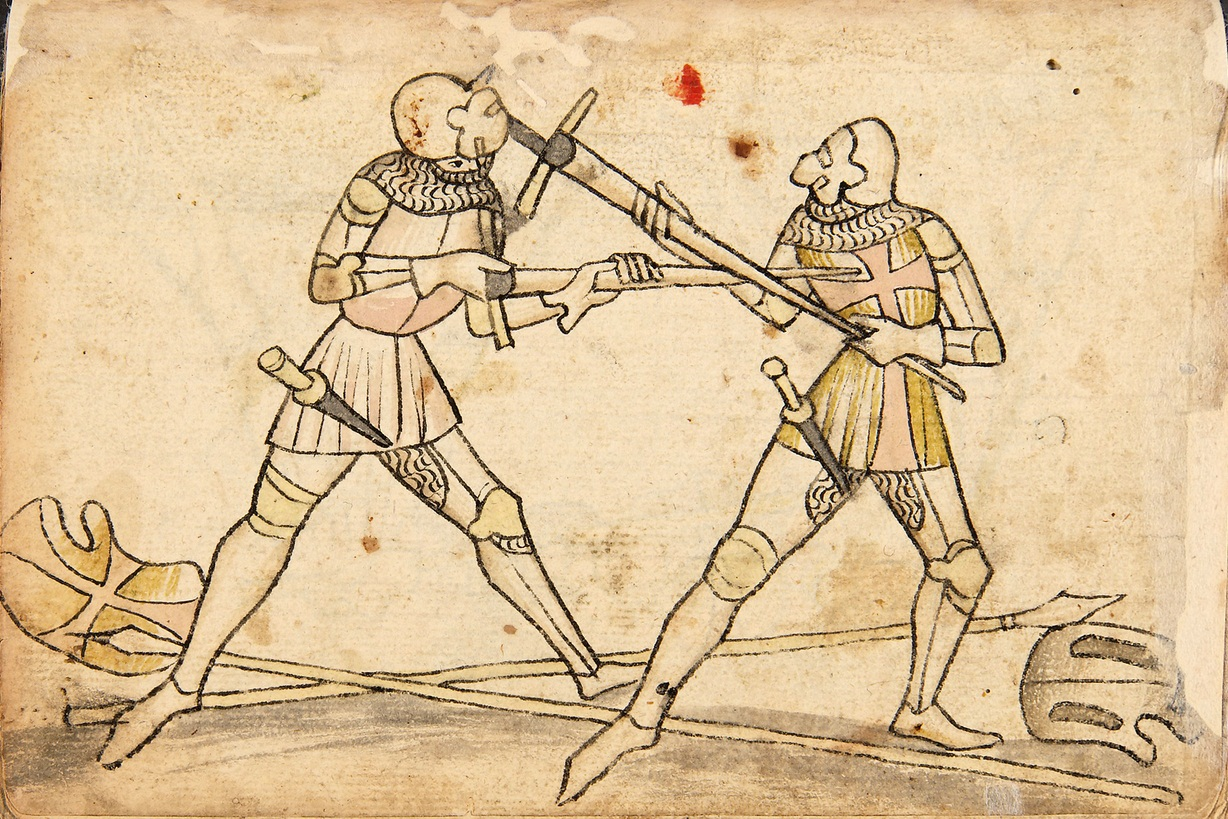
Halbschwert against Mordstreich in the Codex Wallerstein (Plate 214)

Combat in full plate armour made use of the same weapons as Blossfechten, the longsword and dagger (possibly of special make optimized for piercing the openings in armour); but the techniques were entirely different. Attacking an opponent in plate armour is carried out in two ways: percussive force or penetration at joints or unprotected areas. Penetration was extremely unlikely even with thrusting attacks. Percussion was realized with the Mordstreich ("murder strike"), an attack with the hilt when holding the sword at the blade, and then penetration into openings of the armour with the Halbschwert (short sword), which allowed stabbing with greater precision. From the evidence of the Fechtbücher, most armoured fights were concluded by wrestling moves, with one combatant falling to the ground. Lying on the ground, he could then be easily killed with a stab into his visor or another opening of the armour.

Harnischfechten is part of the Historical European martial arts revival movement, with various clubs internationally training in a recreated form of Harnischfechten, also called harness fencing or armored HEMA. Various competive rules have been created for armored HEMA, though armored HEMA remains a niche subcommunity within the wider HEMA community. Harnischfechten is contrasted with buhurt, which trains and competes in a more sport centric armored combat style; more focused on recreating the style of competitions from medieval melee tournaments.

== See also ==
- Academic fencing or Mensur
- English Longsword School
- Historical European Martial Arts
- Italian school of fencing
- Kampfringen

== Literature ==
- Clements, John. Masters of Medieval and Renaissance Martial Arts: Rediscovering The Western Combat Heritage, Paladin Press, 2008. ISBN 978-1-58160-668-3
- Fürgut, Alexander, The Schielhau in Detail: A comprehensive guide about the fundamentals, tactics, and strategy of this longsword technique, ISBN 3982605539 (2025)
- Heim, Hans & Alex Kiermayer, The Longsword of Johannes Liechtenauer, Part I -DVD-, ISBN 1-891448-20-X
- Knight, David James and Brian Hunt, Polearms of Paulus Hector Mair , ISBN 978-1-58160-644-7 (2008)
- Lindholm, David & Peter Svard, Sigmund Ringeck's Knightly Art of the Longsword, ISBN 1-58160-410-6 (2003)
- Schulze, André (ed.), Mittelalterliche Kampfesweisen – Mainz am Rhein. : Zabern
  - vol. 1: Das Lange Schwert, 2006. – ISBN 3-8053-3652-7
  - vol. 2, Kriegshammer, Schild und Kolben, 2007. – ISBN 3-8053-3736-1
  - vol. 3: Scheibendolch und Stechschild, 2007. – ISBN 978-3-8053-3750-2
- Thomas, Michael G., Fighting Man's Guide to German Longsword Combat, ISBN 978-1-906512-00-2 (2008)
- Tobler, Christian Henry, Fighting with the German Longsword, ISBN 1-891448-24-2 (2004)
- Tobler, Christian Henry, Secrets of German Medieval Swordsmanship (2001), ISBN 1-891448-07-2
- Tobler, Christian Henry, In Saint George's Name: An Anthology of Medieval German Fighting Arts (2010), ISBN 978-0-9825911-1-6
