= Royal Armouries Ms. I.33 =

European combat manual created c. 1300

fol. 32r showing the priest in first ward and in schutzen, and Walpurgis remaining in her 'special ward' on the right shoulder

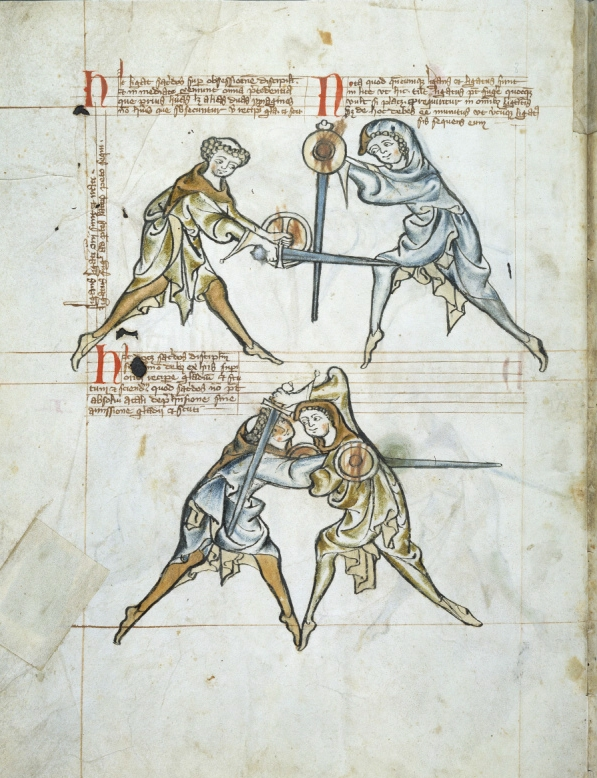
fol. 4v showing the student first in krucke and then gripping the priest's arms with his shield arm

Royal Armouries Ms. I.33 is the earliest known surviving European fechtbuch (combat manual), and one of the oldest surviving martial arts manuals dealing with armed combat worldwide. I.33 is also known as the Walpurgis manuscript, after a figure named Walpurgis shown in the last sequence of the manuscript, and "the Tower manuscript" because it was kept in the Tower of London during 1950-1996; also referred to as British Museum No. 14 E iii, No. 20, D. vi.

It was created around 1300 in Franconia and is first mentioned by Henricus a Gunterrodt in his De veriis principiis artis dimicatoriae of 1579.

The manuscript is anonymous and is so titled through an association with the Royal Armouries Museum.

== The manuscript ==
The manuscript including the text date to about 1270-1320 AD It is first mentioned by Henricus a Gunterrodt in his De veriis principiis artis dimicatoriae of 1579, where he reports it to have been acquired (looted) by a friend of his, one Johannes Herbart of Würzburg when serving in the force of Albert Alcibiades, Margrave of Brandenburg-Kulmbach in the campaigns of 1552/3. It remained in a Franconian monastery (presumably in Upper Franconia) until the mid-16th century. From the 17th century, the manuscript was part of the ducal library of Gotha (signature Cod. Membr. I. no. 115) until it disappeared in World War II and resurfaced at a Sotheby's auction in 1950, where it was purchased by the Royal Armouries. The author of the treatise may be a cleric called Lutegerus (viz. a Latinised form of the German proper name Liutger).

The treatise expounds a martial system of defensive and offensive techniques between a master and a pupil, referred to as sacerdos (priest) and scolaris (student), each armed with a sword and a buckler, drawn in ink and watercolour and accompanied with Latin text, interspersed with German fencing terms. On the last two pages, the pupil is replaced by a woman called Walpurgis.

The pages of the manuscript are vellum, the 32 parchment folia (64 pages) of the manuscript show Latin text written in a clerical hand, using the various sigla which were standard at the time (but which fell out of use at the end of the medieval period; an image from the manuscript (the second image on fol 26r) was copied into Codex Guelf 125.16.Extrav. in the 1600s by a draughtsman who under his drawing stated that he could not decipher the Latin text).

== Contents ==
The pages are thought possibly or very likely from an earlier larger work, which have later been subsequently bound together separated from the other pages. The text provides guidance on the use of a single-handed sword. The fencing system is based on a number of wards (custodie) which are answered by defensive postures (obsessiones). The wards are numbered 1 to 7 on the first two pages and supplemented by various 'special' wards later in the text. The seven basic wards are:

1. under the arm (sub brach)
2. right shoulder (humero dextrali)
3. left shoulder (humero sinistro)
4. head (capiti)
5. right side (latere dextro)
6. breast (pectori)
7. 'long-point' (langort)

The German terms appearing in the Latin text are the following:

- albersleiben (possibly the fool's guard position)
- durchtreten, durchtritt ('stepping through')
- halpschilt ('half shield', one of the obsessiones)
- krucke ('crutch', a defensive position)
- langort ('long-point', may be either a custodia or an obsessio)
- nucken ('nudge', a specific attack)
- schiltslac ('shield-blow')
- schutzen ('protect')
- stich ('stab')
- stichschlac ('stab-blow')
- vidilpoge ('fiddle-bow', a specific custodia)

Sporadic dialectal elements in these terms (notably nucken and halpschilt) suggest a location of composition consistent with the reported discovery in a Franconian monastery in the wider area of Würzburg.
