= Federfechter =

Fencing guild founded in Prague

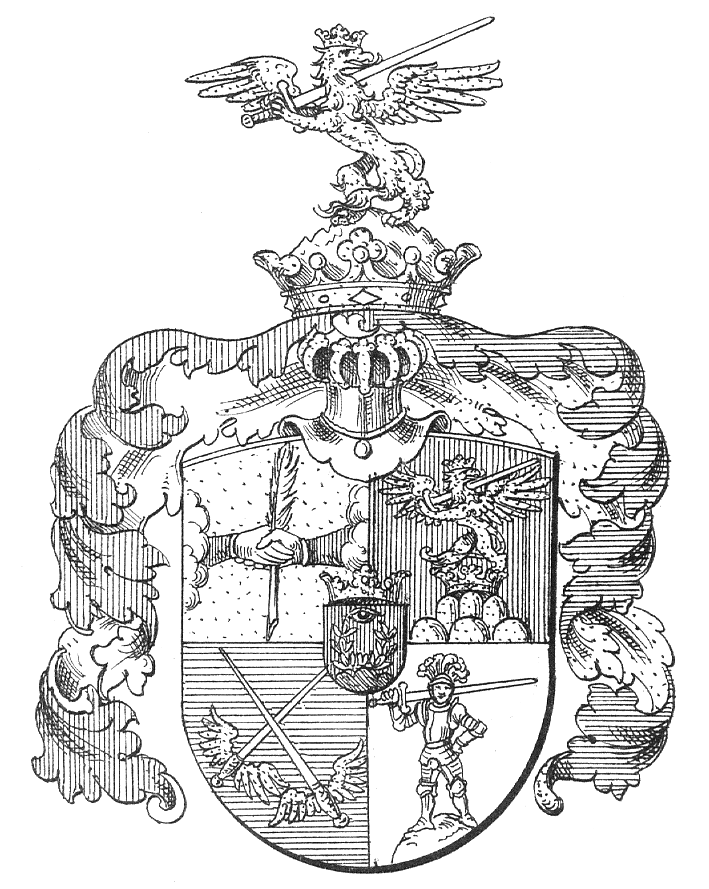
The Federfechter coat of arms shows two hands gripping a quill, a griffin holding a sword (repeated as the crest), two crossing winged swords and a swordsman armed with a Zweihänder.

The Freifechter or Federfechter (Freifechter von der Feder zum Greifenfels) were a fencing guild founded around 1570 in Prague. From early on, they were renowned for their skill, rivaling the Marxbrüder, who had held a monopoly on fencing instruction for almost a century. In 1575, the council of Frankfurt admitted the Federfechter against Marxbrüder protests. On 7 March 1607, the Federfechter were officially recognized by Rudolf II, although their proficiency had been acknowledged long before.

== Origin of the name ==
While Freifechter means "free fencer" (cf. "free lancer"), the origin of the "feather" (Feder) in the guild's name is uncertain. It may derive from Saint Vitus, who is often depicted with a feather, or from the custom of pinning feathers to one's hat or lance. The coat of arms granted to the brotherhood by Rudolf II shows two hands holding a quill (schreibfeder), which led the Grimms to suggest that the guild may have originally been associated with professional scribes.

== Organization and reputation ==
Their original charter reportedly derives from the Duke of Mecklenburg.

The Federfechter may have retained a reputation comparable to the Marxbrüder partly due to the rigorous requirements to hold Fechtschule in the Holy Roman Empire: Fencing masters had to post notice at the city's town hall, demonstrate their skill before the municipal council, and defeat a number of challengers to gain permission. A reason for the stringency of this process presumably was resentment from the Marxbrüder, who viewed the Federfechter as a threat to their privileges. Paradoxically, this resistance may have enhanced the Federfechter reputation, as only highly capable masters could succeed under such conditions.

Notable Federfechter accounts are found in mock rhymes traditionally delivered at Fechtschule events:

- Augustin Staidt, a cutler and Federfechter, expresses the martial ethos of the guild: "Who despises me and my praiseworthy craft, I'll hit on the head that it resounds in his heart."
- Hanns Schuler, a shoemaker and Federfechter from Eschenbach, notes that thick jerkins were sometimes worn by both Federfechter and Marxbrüder during fencing bouts.

By the mid-16th century, the Oberhauptmänner (chief captains) of both the Marxbrüder and Federfechter were frequently present at the imperial court and consulted on matters of honor.

Over time, Federfechterei came to refer more broadly to flashy mock-combat. For example, a 1697 anonymous work describes such a sham fencing bout in which participants "bloodied each other's heads a little" while spectators were invited to contribute money for the entertainment.
