= Nicolaus Pol =

Nicolaus Pol (c. 1467 – 1532) was a Renaissance-era physician. He entered the service of Sigismund of Austria at Innsbruck in 1487, and continued to serve Sigismund's successors, emperors Maximilian and Charles until his death in 1532, at an age of about 65 years. He received a medical degree in 1494, and marked the inside cover of all the books in his library with Nicolaus Pol, doctor, 1494.

Pol collected a substantial library, estimated at some 1350 volumes, an enormous number at the time. The subject matters included all topics of interest to the "Renaissance man", including medicine, natural sciences, alchemy, astrology and divination, etc.

After Pol's death in 1532, his library passed to Innichen Abbey in South Tyrol. Surviving volumes of his library are now scattered, some are found in libraries in Innichen, Innsbruck, and Vienna, and in the USA in the National Library of Medicine, in Yale and in the Allen Memorial Medical Library (33 volumes bought by the Cleveland Medical Library Association in 1929 from Maggs Brothers, for GBP 2,500).

== Work ==
- Nicolai Poll. Medicinæ professoris, & Sacræ Cæsareæ Maiestatis phisici, De cura morbi Gallici per Lignum Guaycanum, libellus at the Internet Archive
