= Paulus Hector Mair =

German renaissance-era fencing master

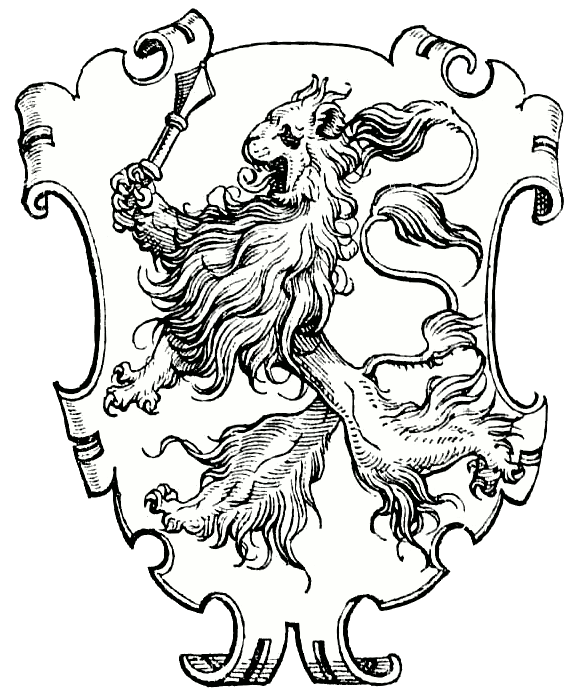
- Coat of arms
- Born: 1517; Augsburg, Germany
- Died: 1579 (aged 61–62); Augsburg, Germany (aged 62)
- Cause of death: Execution by hanging
- Occupation: Civil servant
- Known for: Collecting and compiling Fechtbücher

Paulus Hector Mair (1517–1579) was a German civil servant and fencing master from Augsburg. He collected Fechtbücher (combat manuals) and undertook to compile all knowledge of fencing in a compendium surpassing all earlier books. For this, he engaged the painter Jörg Breu the Younger, as well as two experienced fencers, whom he charged with perfecting the techniques before painting illustrations of them. The project was very costly; it took four years and, according to Mair, consumed most of his family's income and property. Three versions of his compilation and one manuscript have been preserved.

Mair spent huge sums of money on his collections and projects. He also had an expensive lifestyle, frequently hosting receptions for important burghers of Augsburg. His own income was not sufficient for this and for many years, he misappropriated funds from the city treasury, the supervision of which he had been entrusted since 1541. Mair's embezzlements were discovered in 1579 and he was hanged as a thief at the age of 62.

== Martial arts compendium ==
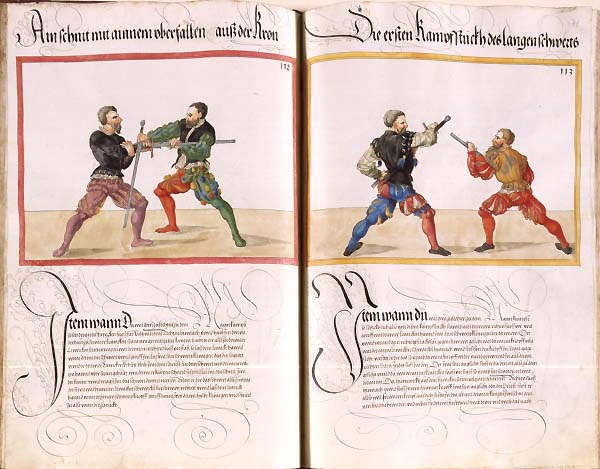
Two techniques from the longsword section in the Dresden codex

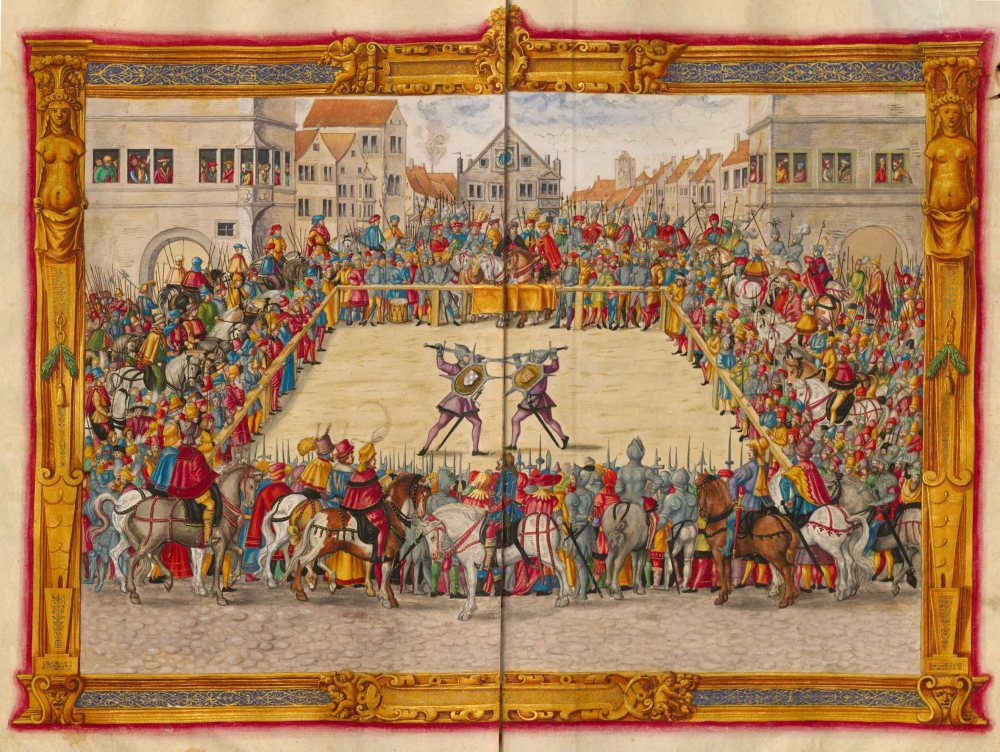
Depiction of a judicial duel in the Munich codex

Paulus Hector Mair compiled a voluminous, encyclopedic compendium of the martial arts of his time, collected in 16 books in two volumes. The book was titled Ars Athletica: A Compendium of Renaissance German Martial Arts. The compendium survives in three manuscript copies. The subject matter is:

- Volume 1:
  - German longsword
  - Dussack (backsword)
  - Staff
  - Pike
  - Halberd
  - Fighting with the scythe
  - Fighting with the sickle. (Note: Mair instructs on wielding a single sickle. He instructs on parrying and cutting, and variations on these and matchups one may encounter while fencing. To parry, Mair instructs that a high cut is parried by holding your weapon below your opponent's, and a low cut is parried by restricting their inside elbow and displacing their weapon. Mair recommends two main types of cuts; high and low. The optimal target of a low cut is the jugular and the high cut the back of the head.)
  - Unarmed combat (wrestling)
- Volume 2:
  - Dagger
  - Spanish rapier
  - Battle axe
  - Joust, mounted combat for sport
  - Tournament history and rules
  - Judicial combat
  - Mounted combat, serious (self-defense)
  - Fencing in plate armour (shield, spear, longsword)

== Manuscripts ==
- Three copies of the compendium, in two volumes each:
  - German version: Saxon State and University Library, Dresden, Mscr. Dresd. C 93/94, after 1542, two volumes, 244+328 folia.
    - online facsimile: Digital Collections of the SLUB Dresden
  - Latin version: Bavarian state library, Munich cod. icon 393, after 1542, two volumes, 309+303 folia. This is the most luxurious production of Mair's, and he sold it to Duke Albert V. of Bavaria, allegedly for 800 fl., in 1567
    - online facsimiles: De arte athletica Tome I, De arte athletica Tome II, daten.digitale-sammlungen.de
  - Bilingual Latin-German version: Austrian national library, Vienna, Codex Vindobensis 10825/26 after 1542, two volumes, 270+343 folia.
    - Online facsimiles: microfilm scans (thearma.org)
- Jörg Breu Sketchbook (Cod.I.6.2°.4), Augsburg city archive, Schätze B2 Reichsstadt, 1553, 110 folia, illustrated by Heinrich Vogtherr, based material acquired from Anthon Rast of Nürnberg (d. 1549).
  - Online facsimile: media.bibliothek.uni-augsburg.de, gesellschaft-lichtenawers.eu

== Literature ==
- Knight, David James and Brian Hunt. Polearms of Paulus Hector Mair. Paladin Press, 2008. ISBN 978-1-58160-644-7.

== See also ==
- Historical European Martial Arts
- German school of swordsmanship
