= Colombani =

Colombani is a surname of Italian origin, in turn derived from Latin columbe, which means dove.

People with the surname include

- Giuseppe Colombani (1676–1736), Italian soldier, fencing master, and dentist
- Quirino Colombani (c.1668–1735), Italian composer, musician, and music teacher
- Jean-Marie Colombani (born 1948), French journalist
- Laetitia Colombani (born 1976}, French writer and filmmaker
- Paul Colombani, American pediatric surgeon
- Paul-André Colombani, French politician representing Pè a Corsica
