= Codex Vindobonensis B 11093 =

The Codex Vindobonensis B 11093 (Code of the Austrian National Library at Vienna) is an anonymous fechtbuch of 46 pages of drawn illustrations only, with no text, dating to the mid 15th century, probably created in southern Germany. It has been grouped together with the "Gladiatoria" fechtbuch, forming a "Gladiatoria group" outside the mainstream of Johannes Liechtenauer's school.
