= Jacob Sutor =

German fencer

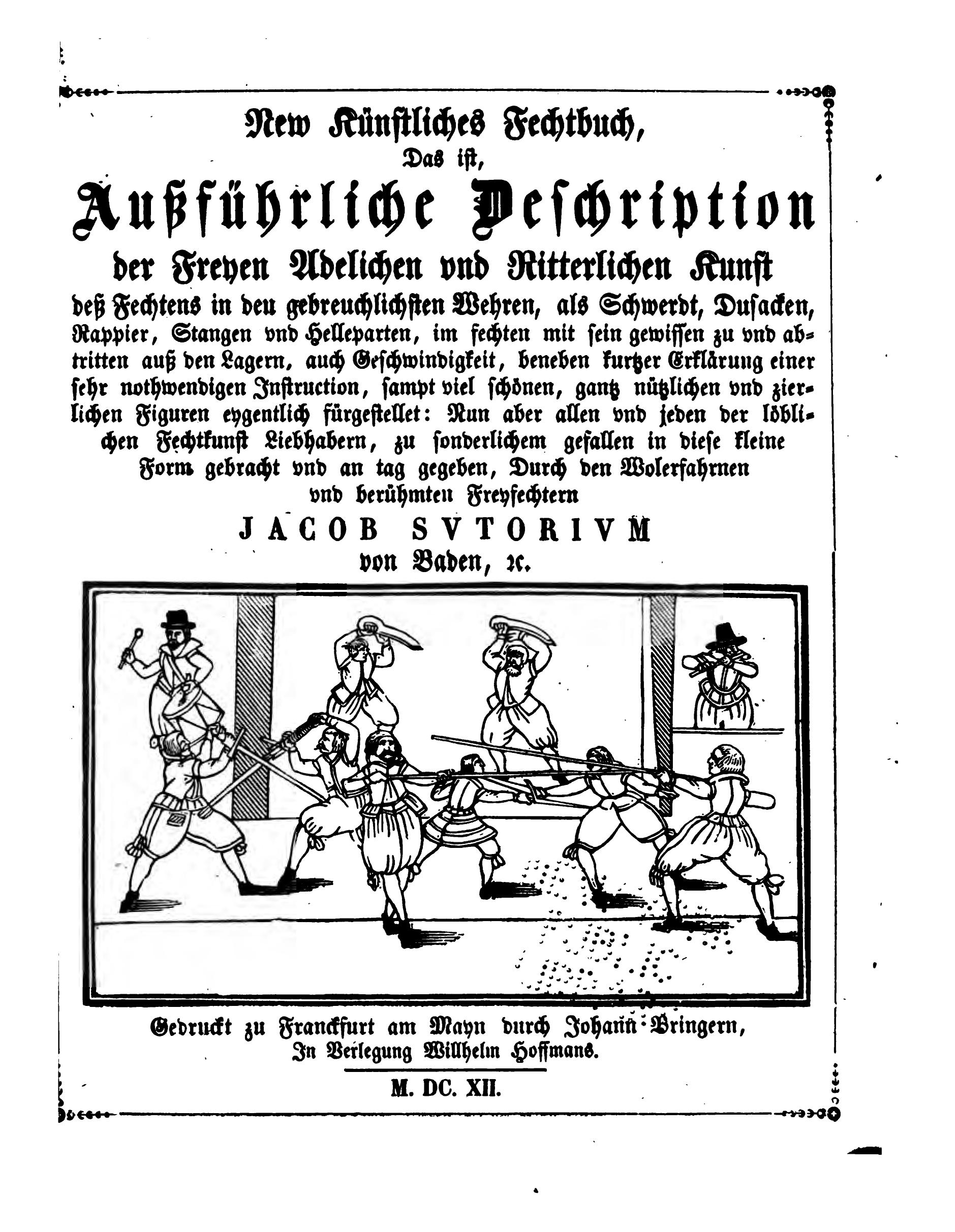

Jacob Sutor (also spelled "Jakob Sutor") was a German fencing master who published a fighting manual in 1612, called the Neues Künstliches Fechtbuch. The book was mostly an updated version (or outright plagiarism) of Joachim Meyer's 1570 work, Gründtliche Beschreibung der Kunst des Fechtens.

Sutor's Fechtbuch includes techniques for the long sword, dussack, rapier (which appears to be an early form of the weapon more similar to a cut and thrust sword), rapier and main gauche, rapier and cloak, case of rapiers, staff, poleaxe, and the flail.
