= Messer (sword) =

Single-edged sword

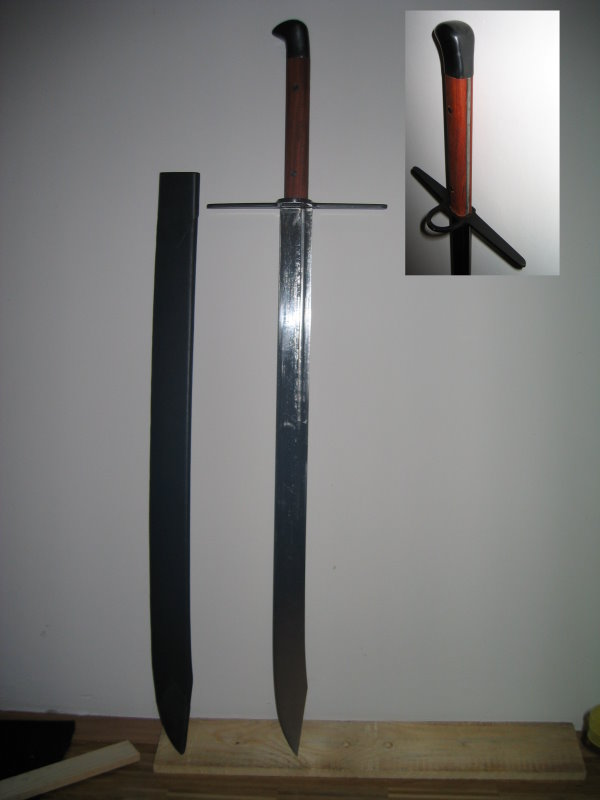
- Großes Messer
- Type: Knife

Service history
- In service: 15th century – 16th century

Specifications
- Mass: 0.96–1.4 kg (2.1–3.1 lb)
- Length: 75–113 cm (30–44 in)
- Blade length: 62–85 cm (24–33 in)
- Blade type: Single-edged
- Hilt type: Cruciform and riveted, with end cap or pommel and nagel

A messer (German for "knife") is a single-edged sword of the 15th and 16th century, characterised by knife-like hilt construction methods.

While the various names are often used synonymously, messers can be divided into several principal groups:

A Bauernwehr ("peasant's knife" or "peasant's sidearm") or Hauswehr ("home/household knife") is a single-handed knife, used for utility and defence. Typical blade lengths range from 15 cm (5.9 in) lengths up to around 35 cm (14 in).

Messer, Langes Messer, and Großes Messer ("knife", "long knife", and "great knife" respectively) are usually single-handed swords used for self-defence. These blade lengths ranged from about 45 cm (18 in) to 90 cm (35 in). Hilts are normally suited to single handed use, but the larger examples may feature extended grips suitable for a second hand-hold.

Kriegsmesser ("war knife") are the largest examples of messer-hilted weapons, ranging from around 1 m (3 ft 3 in) long with approximately 80 cm (31 in) blade, up to around 1.35 m (4 ft 5 in) long with blades up to 1 m (3 ft 3 in) in length. Designed to be used with both hands, such messers were dedicated military arms, normally wielded by professional soldiers during the 15th and 16th century, such as the Landsknecht.

These names are subjective, and there are no known texts which clearly codify the differences between groups. As such, a large Bauernwehr might well have also been called a Messer, or a large Großes Messer might have been called a Kriegsmesser.

== Typology ==
To combat the inherent uncertainties in using the period terms like "Messer", "langes Messer", and "Großes Messer" which are sometimes interchangeable, there is a typology created by James G. Elmslie for European single-edged arms, which classifies messer and falchion forms, similar to the Oakeshott typology used for double-edged arming swords.

== Origin and geography ==
Messer appear to have emerged in the region of Southern Germany, Switzerland, or Northern Austria in the first few years of the 15th century, as small Bauernwehr and Hauswehr civilian knives of low social status. As such their exact date of origin is uncertain, the earliest known depiction being from around 1430. Those knives grow steadily larger, and depictions of sword-sized messer are found by the end of the 1440s in Fechtbücher.

While the name messer is German, messer hilted arms have been found in multiple European nations, with local or regional names. Examples of messer are found in the Netherlands and Northern France, Iceland, Sweden, and the Baltic Nations, in the central European nations of Poland, Czechia, Hungary and Romania, and to the south of Germany in Switzerland, Austria, Slovenia, and northern parts of the Balkan nations.

The geographical spread of messers can be traced from known centres of manufacture in areas like Passau and Solingen, through medieval river trade routes, and the shipping networks of the Hanseatic League. As such, It is most likely that very similar messer hilts found in for example, Iceland, northern Germany, and northern Poland are evidence of export of Passau blades during the late 15th and early 16th centuries, rather than examples of indigenous manufacture.

== Construction ==
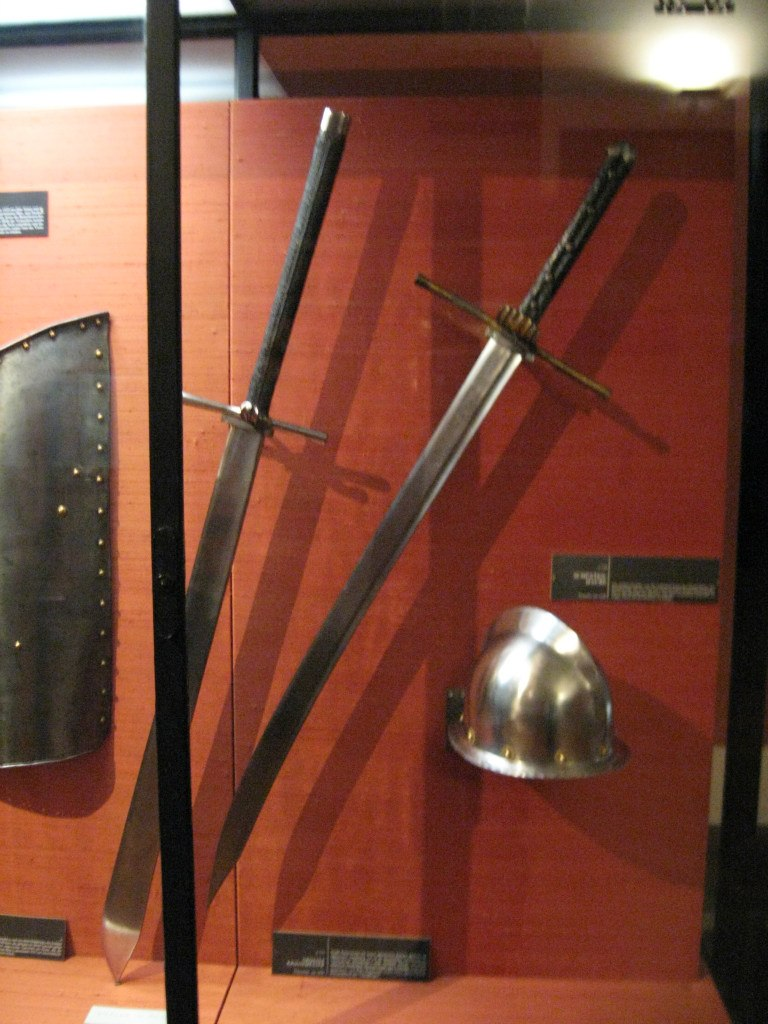
A Großes Kriegsmesser in the Kunsthistorisches Museum, Vienna

Messer are characterized by single-edged blades mounted on knife-like hilts. The lengths and shape of blades can vary greatly, with straight or curved profiles, broad or narrow blades, and presence or absence of fullers. Extant examples of langes messer seem to have an overall length of 30 in (76 cm) with a 24.5 in (62 cm) blade, and a weight between 2–2.5 lb (0.91–1.13 kg).

The principal feature of the messer is its hilt construction, which is usually different to that of contemporary European swords. Most messer are assembled with the hilt consisting of a slab tang sandwiched between two wooden grip plates which are pinned or riveted into place.

Messer usually feature a Nagel: a nail-like protrusion which projects out from the right side of the cross-guard perpendicular to the flat of the blade, which protects the knuckles of the wielder's hand from injury. On the smallest messers and most bauernwehr the nagel is usually driven through the wooden grips of the hilt. On larger messer, a steel cross-guard is normally found, and the nagel is slotted through a hole in the centre of the cross-guard. The length of the hilt is normally proportionate to the length of the blade, with longer blades featuring hilts long enough to enable gripping with both hands.

While the majority of messer hilts are constructed of wood, a small proportion of extant examples exhibit hilts of other materials - horn, bone, or leather-covered wood. A smaller section yet display highly complex hilt construction techniques, using metal frame construction containing organic panels, such as exotic wood and mother-of pearl, or chequerboard patterns constructed from bone and dark horn.

Messer do not normally feature pommels like contemporary two-edged swords. Instead, those which have a metal pommel tend to feature asymmetrical profiles which curve down towards the edged side of the blade - a feature which is sometimes called a "Hat shape", or a "bird's beak" pommel. Some examples terminate in ovoid metal caps which form a flat face, and some have no metal terminal at all, instead being plain wood, or leather-covered wood.

Messer hilt construction techniques develop over time, and in the 16th century, sometimes begin to match contemporary two-edged sword construction methods, to the point that it is difficult to differentiate between the two groups.

== Fighting with the messer ==
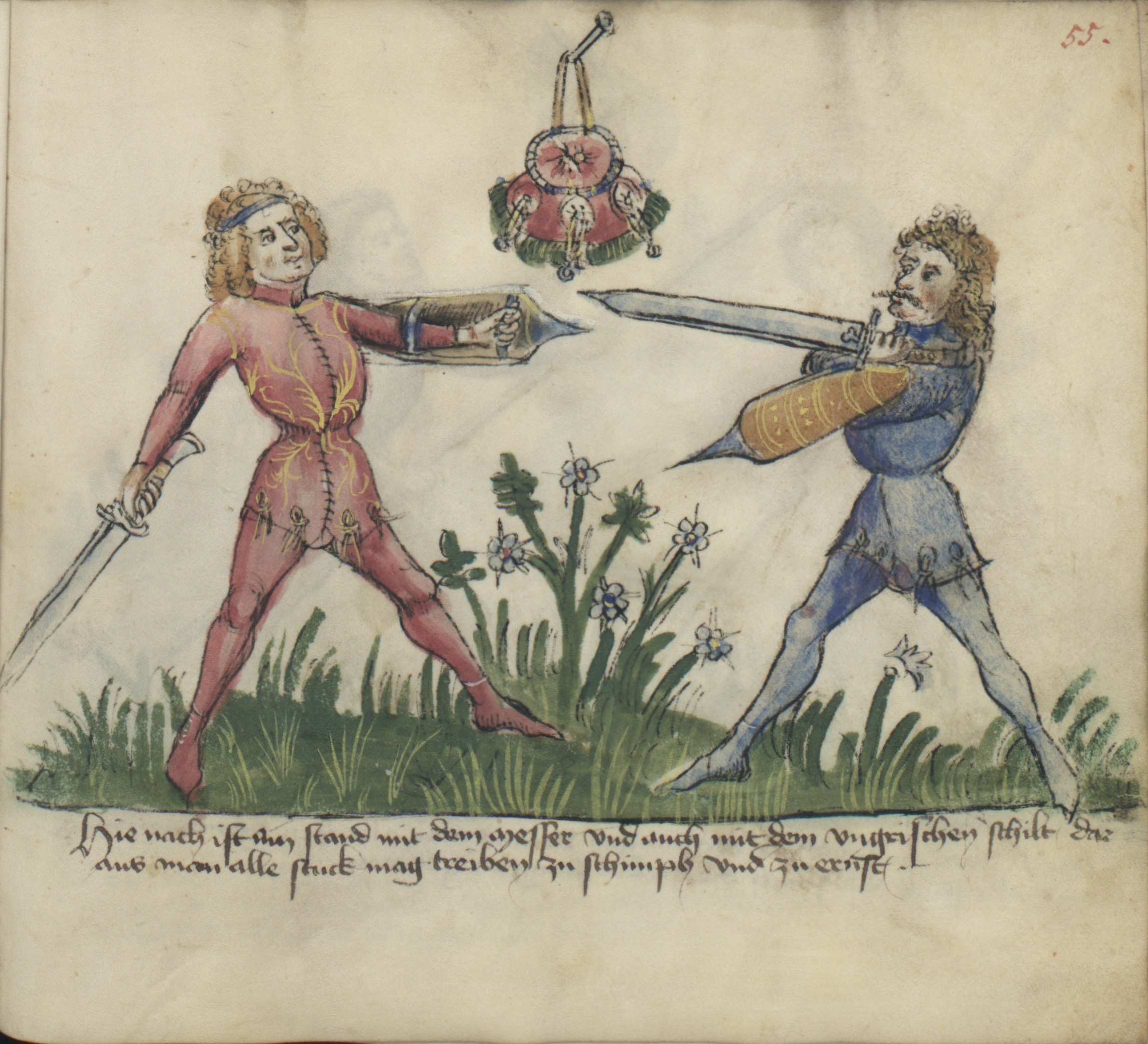
Fighting with a Messer and a "Hungarian shield" (Gladiatoria Fechtbuch fol. 55r, mid-15th century)

The messer was part of the curriculum of several Fechtbücher (fighting manuals) of the 15th and 16th centuries, including that of Johannes Lecküchner (dealing with the langes messer), the Codex Wallerstein, Hans Talhoffer, Paulus Kal and Albrecht Dürer.

== See also ==
- Falchion
- Johannes Lecküchner
- Machete
- Nodachi
- Swiss degen
- Zhanmadao
