= Joachim Meyer =

German fencing master (1537–1571)

Joachim Meÿer
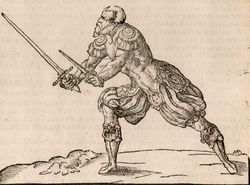
- Born: ca. 1537; Basel, Old Swiss Confederacy
- Died: February 23, 1571 (aged 33); Schwerin, Germany, Holy Roman Empire
- Citizenship: Strasbourg
- Occupations: Knife maker Freifechter
- Spouse: Appolonia Ruhlman
- Writing career
- Language: Early New High German
- Genre: Fencing manual or fechtbuch
- Notable works: Gründtliche Beschreibung der Kunst des Fechtens (1570); MS A.4°.2 (1560); MS Var.82 (1570-71)

Joachim Meyer (ca. 1537–1571) was a self-described Freifechter (literally, Free Fencer) living in the then Free Imperial City of Strasbourg in the 16th century and the author of a fechtbuch Gründtliche Beschreibung der Kunst des Fechtens (in English, Thorough Descriptions of the Art of Fencing) first published in 1570.

== Works ==
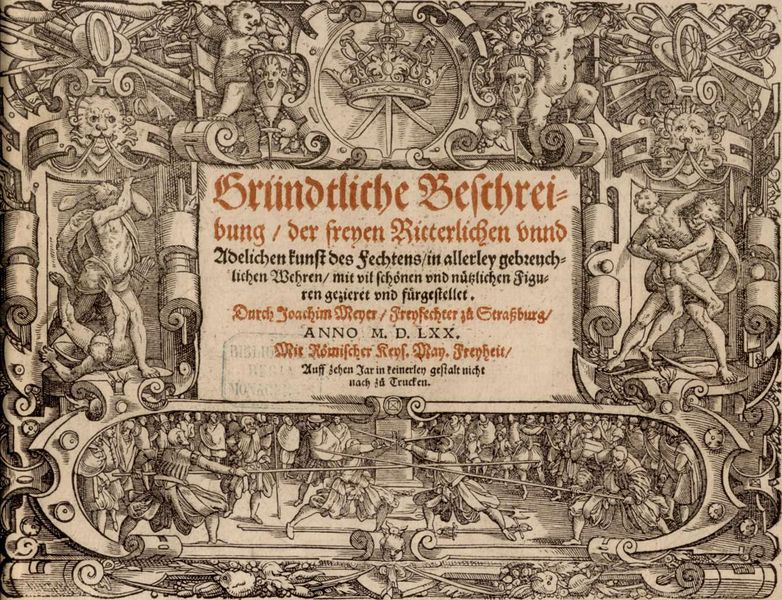

In 1570, Joachim Meyer wrote a comprehensive, multi-weapon treatise entitled Gründtliche Beschreibung der Kunst des Fechtens or, in English, Thorough Descriptions of the Art of Fencing. It is seen as one of the most complete systems within medieval German martial arts. Meyer's book was reprinted in 1600, and may have been an influential source for other 16th- and 17th-century German fencing books, including a 1612 book by Jacob Sutor. His book mostly consists of descriptive text, with only a few dozen woodcuts, each of which depicts several players enacting various techniques described in the text itself. The book consists of five chapters, covering the long sword, dussack (a training weapon not unlike the messer), rapier, dagger, and polearms.

Meyer's system generally flows from, and uses the terminology of, the German school of swordsmanship as set down by Johannes Lichtenauer, though Meyer's civilian system also appears to draw from contemporary Italian swordplay, including Achille Marozzo.

Meyer's book itself consists of detailed explanatory text describing the guards or postures (huten) for each weapon, cuts, footwork and specific and often quite complex plays or devices (stücke), accompanied by a series of finely executed woodcuts, each of which depicts scenes set amongst somewhat fantastical fight school (fechtschule) settings. These woodcuts typically depict the postures, cutting schemes (signs or 'segno' in Italian) as well as several players enacting various techniques described in the text itself. The book consists of five sections, covering the longsword, dussack (a training weapon not unlike the Messer), rapier (in Meyer's case, a single-handed sword utilised for both cut and thrust), dagger and wrestling, and polearms including the quarterstaff, halberd and pike. In common with earlier German sources, Meyer's system gives pride of place to the longsword, which is both the first weapon discussed, and the weapon treated in most detail, forming an exemplar-teaching tool for the rest of the system. However, the rapier, dagger and polearm techniques and devices described in Meyer's book do not appear to concede much to sporting considerations, featuring as they do the thrusts omitted from the longsword section, as well as a range of possibly lethal fight ending techniques. Furthermore, the longsword section of Meyer's book in particular shows definite descent from the earlier corpus of the Liechtenauer tradition (Meyer mentions Liechtenauer by name), and remains one of the most detailed, systematic and complete sources for this weapon.

== Life ==
Meyer's book was reprinted in 1600 in Augsburg, and became a highly influential source for other 16th- and 17th-century German fencing books, including the aforementioned book by Jacob Sutor and a book from 1672 by an Italian, Theodor Verolinus. Both versions were simplified redactions of Meyer's more detailed work. Meyer is mentioned in a brief Latin treatise on martial arts by Heinrich von Gunterrodt (1579) and is also the only German among the famous masters listed in the late 17th century fencing treatise by Giuseppe Morsicato Pallavicini.

Little is known about Meyer himself. Some information on Meyer's life has come to light as a result of recent scholarship (Dupuis). "Originally from Basel, he (Meyer) became a burgher of Strasbourg by marrying a widow in 1560, most likely during his apprenticeship as a cutler. He made a living as both a cutler and a professional fencer until 1570, in which year he published the book that was to make him famous. The making of this book left him deeply indebted, and the search for potential buyers led him to leave Strasbourg and work as a Master-of-Arms at the court of the Duke of Schwerin. Unfortunately, death seized him a short time after his arrival, leaving the burden of his debt to his widow and brother-in-law."

== Bibliography ==
- Dupuis, Olivier. (2006). "Joachim Meyer, escrimeur libre, bourgeois de Strasbourg (1537?-1571)." Maîtres & Techniques de Combat à la fin du Moyen Age et au Début de la Renaissance: 107-120. Ed. by Fabrice Cognot. Paris: Association pous l'Edition et la Diffusion des Études Historiques. ISBN 2-907594-10-9.
- VanSlambrouck, Christopher. The Life and Work of Joachim Meyer. (2010). Meyer Free Fencers Guild.
- Dupuis, Olivier. Joachim Meyer, free fencer, citizen of Strassburg (?1537-1571) [trans. by J.L. Forgeng], in Jeffrey L. Forgeng The Art of the Sword combat, a 1568 German Treatise on Swordsmanship (London: Front Line, 2016, pp. 171-190). ISBN 1473876753
- Forgeng, Jeffrey L. Introduction in The Art of the Sword combat, a 1568 German Treatise on Swordsmanship (London: Front Line, 2016, pp. 2-7). ISBN 1473876753
- Mondschein, Ken; Dupuis, Olivier. Martial Sport, and Urban Culture in Early Modern Germany: The Case of Strasbourg, in Journal of Medieval Military History, Vol. 17, The Boydell Press, 2019, pp. 237–57. DOI: 10.2307/j.ctvb4bv8d.10
- VanSlambrouck, Christopher. Meÿer source transcripts & translation (2021). DOI: 10.13140/RG.2.2.11834.06085
- Dupuis, Olivier. A new manuscript of Joachim Meyer (1561), in Acta Periodica Duellatorum, Vol.9-1 (2021). DOI: https://doi.org/10.36950/apd-2021-004
- Norling, Roger. Joachim Meyer and His World, in Foundational Description of the Art of Fencing (Reading Edition). Medford: HEMA Bookshelf, 2023. ISBN 978-1-953683-35-9
- VanSlambrouck, Christopher. The Brief Life and Times of Joachim Meyer, in (vol 1 of 2) Foundational Description of the Art of Fencing (Reference Edition). Medford: HEMA Bookshelf, 2023. ISBN 978-1-953683-30-4
