= Le Jeu de la Hache =

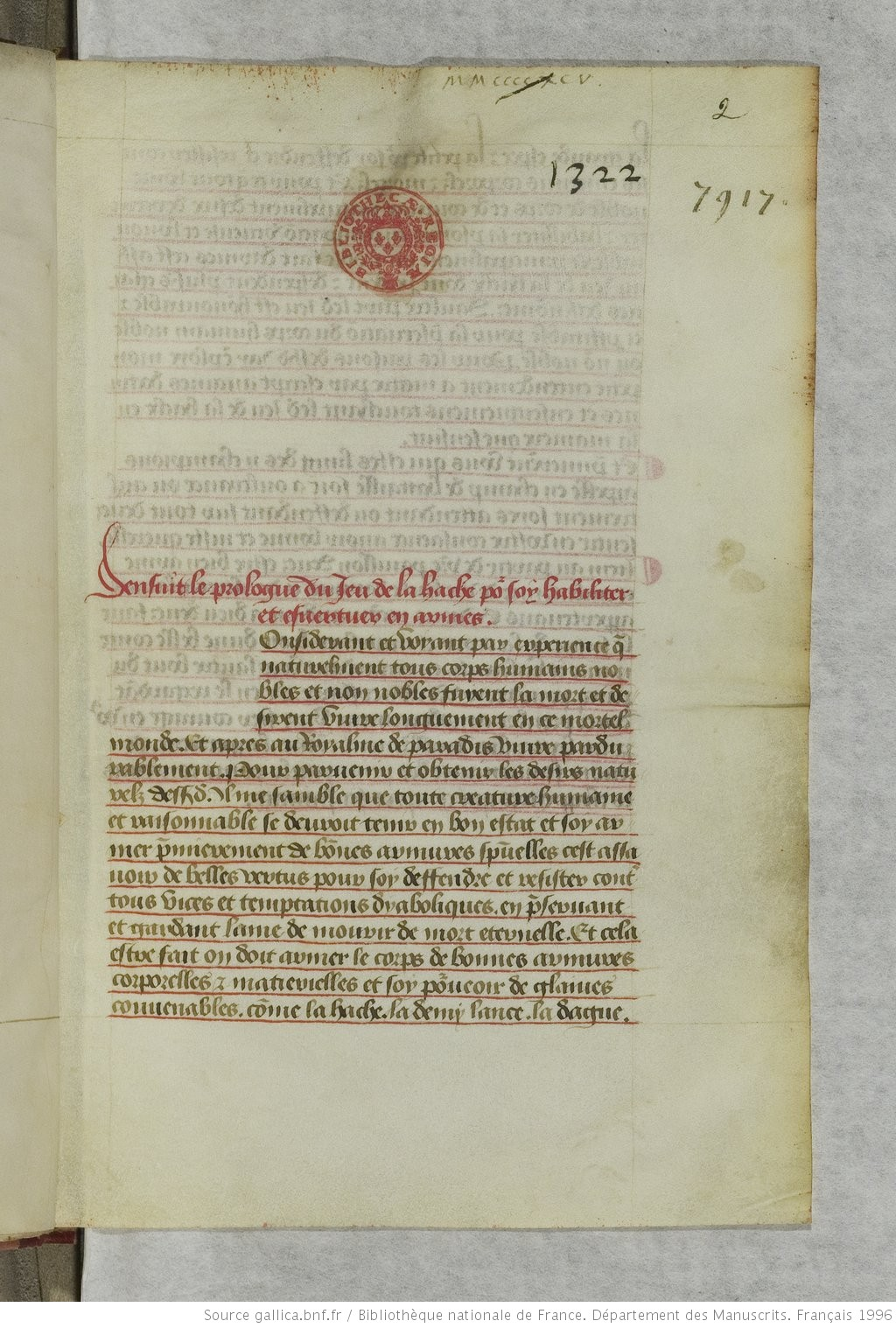
The first page of the manual

Le Jeu de la Hache ("The Play of the Axe") is a French manual on combat with the poleaxe dating to c. 1400.

The manuscript measures 240 by 160 mm (9.4 by 6.3 in) and consists of ten vellum leaves. The text consists of a prologue (fols. 2r-v, paragraphs 1-4), a main section (paragraphs 4-51) describing combat between two right-handed opponents, followed by a shorter part (paragraphs 52-73) discussing how a right-handed knight should deal with a left-handed opponent.

The manuscript is recorded to have been part of the library of Francis I in 1544 as it was moved to Fontainebleau.

== Literature ==
- Anglo, Sydney (1991). "V. Le Jeu de la Hache. A Fifteenth-Century Treatise on the Teaching of Chivalric Axe Combat". Archaeologia. 109: 113–128. doi:10.1017/S0261340900014053 – via Cambridge Core.

== See also ==
- Fechtbuch
- Fiore dei Liberi
