= Johannes Lecküchner =

Johannes Lecküchner (c. 1430s – 1482) was a 15th-century priest and fencer of the area of Nuremberg. He was inscribed at the University of Leipzig in 1455 and receives the title of bacalaureus in 1457. He was ordained acolyte in 1459, and as priest at some point before 1478. He was employed as communal priest in Herzogenaurach from 1480 until his death on 31 December 1482.

Two Fechtbücher for the großes Messer by the hand of Lecküchner are preserved, Cod. Pal. Germ. 430 (Heidelberg, 1478), and Cgm. 582, Munich, 1482. The latter he completed on 19 January 1482. The earlier manuscript is considered a draft for the later, and only Cgm 582 contains illustrations.^{1}

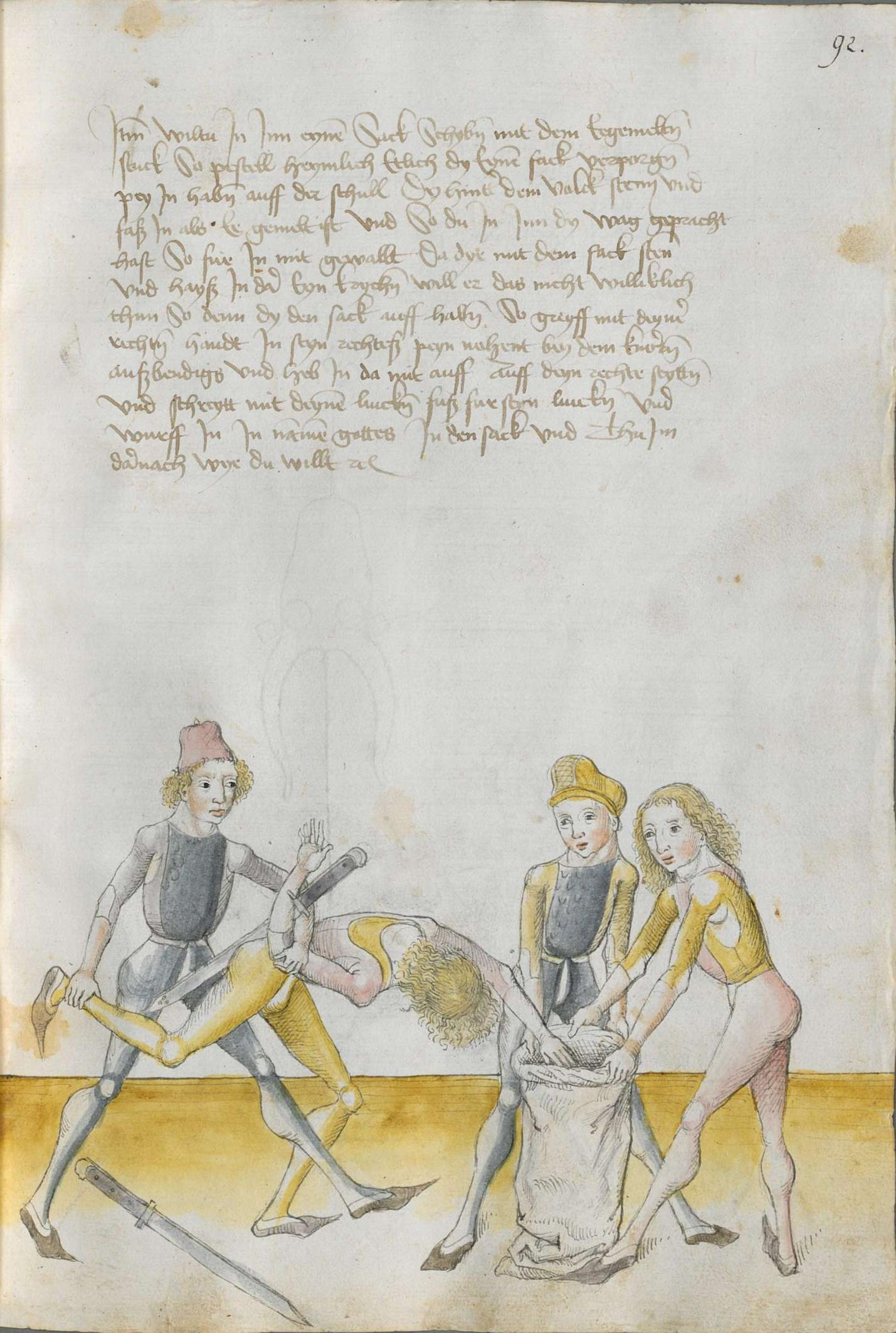
Cgm 582, fol 92r: instructions for bagging the opponent.

The Cgm 582 manuscript on 216 folia (432 pages) gives instructions for the fencing with the großes Messer, illustrated by 415 drawings of fencers. Some 19th-century scholars have assumed that the name Lecküchner is in fact a corrupted version of the name of Johannes Liechtenauer, and that the two masters are identical. Biographical information from archives as well as the colophon in the manuscript itself makes quite clear, however, that Lecküchner has an independent existence as a historical author. His system is, however, based on the teachings of Liechtenauer dating to about a century earlier, since Lecküchner organizes his system in the same way as Liechtenauer, and also uses the same terminology that is present in his longsword teachings.
