= Gründtliche Beschreibung der Kunst des Fechtens =

1570 manual by Joachim Meyer

A Foundational Description of the Art of Fencing
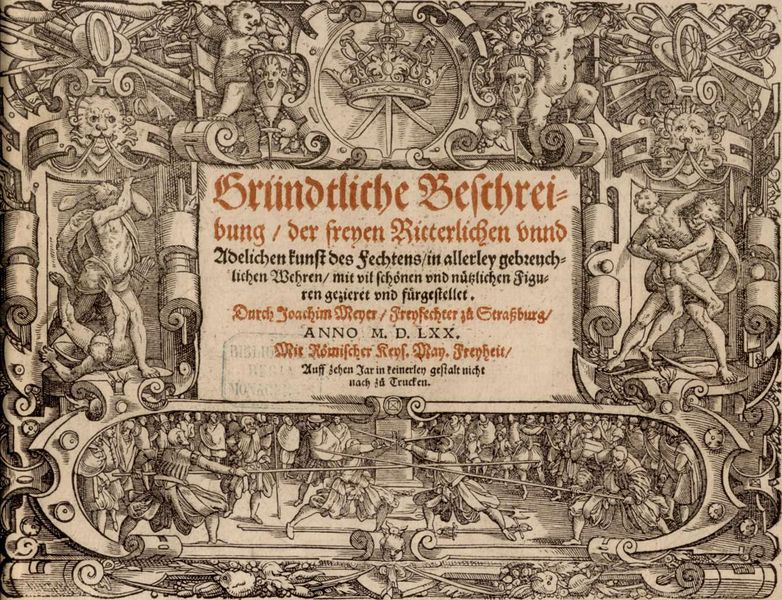
- Author: Joachim Meyer
- Original title: Gründtliche Beschreibung der Kunst des Fechtens
- Illustrator: Tobias Stimmer's workshop
- Language: Early New High German
- Genre: Fencing manual fechtbuch wrestling manual
- Publisher: Thiebolt Berger
- Publication date: 1570
- Publication place: Germany, Holy Roman Empire
- Media type: Print (Hardcover)
- Pages: 379
- Preceded by: MS A.4°.2 manuscript

Gründtliche Beschreibung der Kunst des Fechtens or, in English: A Foundational Description of the Art of Fencing: A Thorough Description of the Free, Knightly and Noble Art of Fencing, Showing Various Customary Defenses, Affected and Put Forth with Many Handsome and Useful Drawings is a German fencing manual that was published in 1570. Its author was the Freifechter Joachim Meyer. This manual was made for and was dedicated to Meyer's patron Count Palatine Johann Casimir. This fechtbuch builds on his earlier work, a manuscript written in 1560 - the MS A.4°.2, and presents a complex, multi-weapon treatise. Meyer's complete system often marks the end of and the compilation of the German fencing system in the Johannes Liechtenauer tradition. It is the only fechtbuch in the Liechtenauer tradition that was written for both laymen and beginners of the art.

== Publication history ==
The first edition of Gründtliche Beschreibung der Kunst des Fechtens was published in 1570 in the city of Strasbourg. It was printed just a couple months before Joachim Meyer's death in 1571. After Meyer's death, his widow, Appolonia Ruhlman, sold the original woodcuts used for the illustrations in the book to pay off the 300 crown debt that Meyer had incurred over the writing and publishing of his fechtbuch. In 1600, Meyer's widow republished the book in Augsburg, Germany.

According to some sources, the book may have been republished in 1610 and again in 1660, but so far only the 1570 and 1600 editions have been recovered.

== Contents ==
The treatise contains three books in five parts within its 379 pages.

Book 1, Part 1 - Longsword
Book 2, Part 2 - Dusack
Book 2, Part 3 - Side sword or rapier
Book 3, Part 4 - Dagger
Book 3, Part 5 - Staff and polearms
