= Giuseppe Colombani =

Giuseppe Colombani is known as l'Alfier lombardo (the Pride of Lombardy) He is unrelated to Francesco Alfieri - the Italian word l'Alfier(e) means "the standard bearer". He wrote a treatise on martial arts, published in 1711. It is the latest known treatise discussing the spadone, or longsword, before the revivalist movements of historical fencing in the 20th century.
