= British Library, Harley MS 3542 =

Harley MS 3542 is a manuscript dating to the medieval times, specifically the late sixteenth century. The manuscript shows alchemical and medical recipes in addition to containing instruction of martial techniques using a two-handed sword. The manuscript is part of the Harleian Collection.

The manuscript contains instruction of martial techniques and is one of three extant sources on martial techniques in Middle English, the other two being British Library Cotton MS Titus A XXV, folio 105 and British Library Add MS 39564.

Thomas Byaed was a sixteenth century vicar who possessed a booklet written by three people named John Pauper, John Dastin and John Sawtry which was bound subsequently into Harley MS 3542. Also included in the manuscript is a work Treatise on pulses written by Walter Agilon, selected parts of works which were written by Roger de Baron and Roger of Parma, the third treatise of the Trotula ensemble, and a work by Ralph Hoby on the subjects of astronomy and medicine.

== See also ==
- Martial arts manual
