= Francesco Alfieri =

Italian fencer

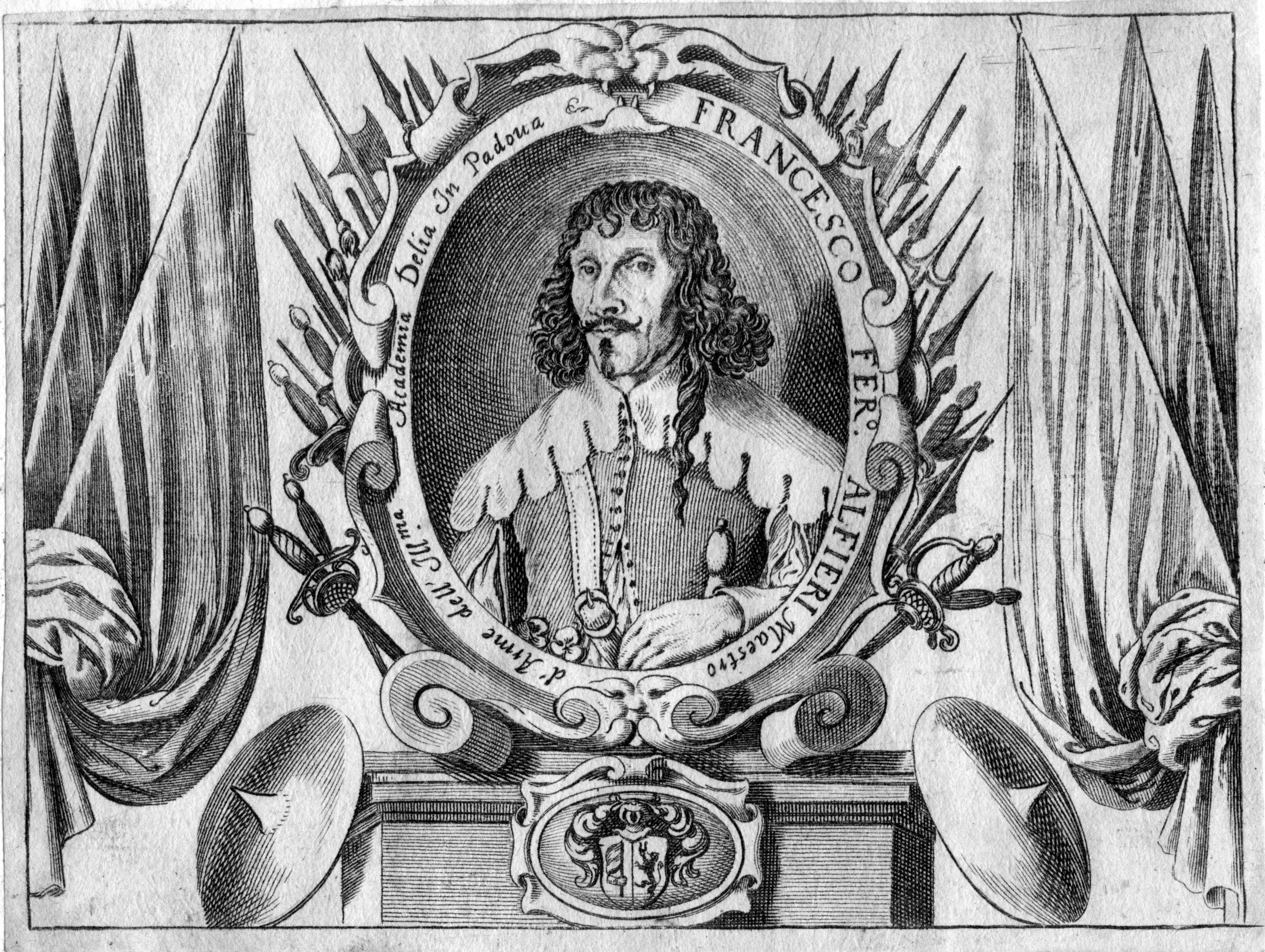
Francesco F. Alfieri

Francesco Ferdinando Alfieri was a fencer in the 17th century. He was a representative of the Venetian school of fencing and “Maestro D’Arme” to the Accademia Delia in Padua in 1640. Alfieri was originally from Padua, which at that time was the territory of the Venetian Republic.

Many Venetian and Italian fencing masters in their treatises praised Alfieri as a "master of fencing". Documents from outside of Italy have also been found referring to him. Blasco Florio says in his treatise "The Science of Fencing with the sword of Blasco Florio" (La scienza della scherma esposta da Blasco Florio):

"We know Alfieri as a great scientist, and he will remain so in our memory"

— Blasco Florio

== Works ==
Several treatises by Alfieri are known:

- La Bandiera ("The Ensign" or "Flag"), published in 1638, which discusses the flag drill
- La Scherma ("Fencing"), published in 1640 and reprinted in 1645, which discusses rapier fencing
- La Picca ("The Pike"), published in 1641, discusses the pike drill and also appends the entirety of his treatise on the flag drill
- L’arte di ben maneggiare la spada ("The Art of Handling the Sword Well"), published in 1653 and reprinted in 1683, which includes the entirety of his treatise on rapier fencing and appends a section on the use of the Spadone (two-handed sword).
- "The Art of Excellent Possession of the Sword", includes his entire treatise on fencing with a rapier, and added a section on the use of Spadone (a two-handed sword).

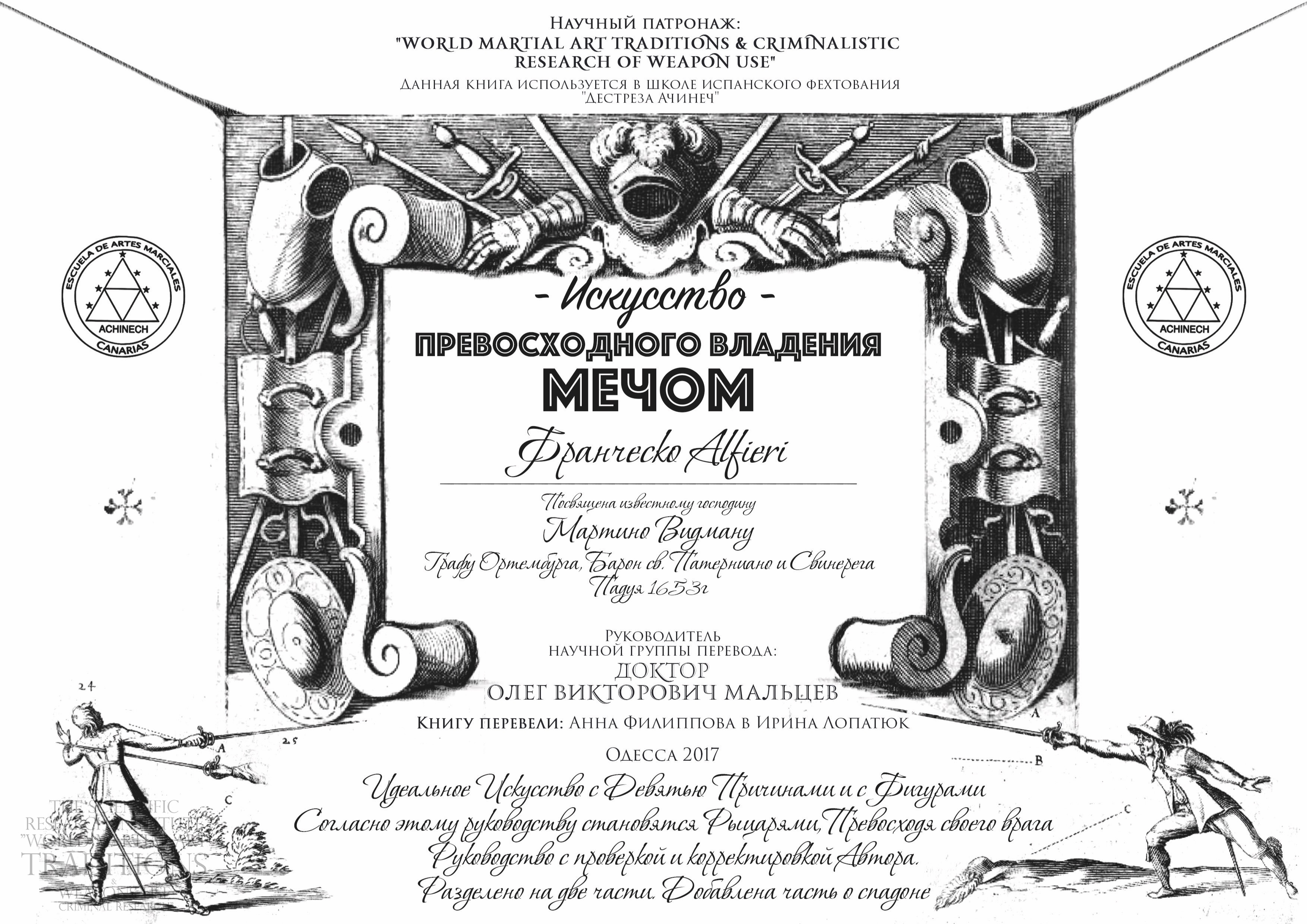
Treatise The Art of Excellent Possession of the Sword by Francesco Alfieri

Alfieri's 1653 edition of the "L'arte di ben maneggiare la spada" - was translated by scientists and masters of fencing from the Italian language into Russian. The book was published under the title "The Art of Excellent Possession of the Sword". The translation was made by the Research Institute "World Traditions of Martial Arts and Criminal Investigations of the Use of Weapons" in cooperation with the School of Spanish Fencing "Destreza Achinech"

== The Art of Excellent Swordplay ==
Alfieri's treatise "The Art of Excellent Sword Ownership" aroused great admiration and respect among the masters of fencing, as it became one of the most popular fencing books. Even in the modern world of fencing, this treatise is considered to be one of fencing's best textbooks.

One of the disciples described the treatise of his great teacher:

"Having read the book on weapons written by Mr. Francesco, I enjoyed myself. I took the basic doctrine and also felt this delicate facet of the revival of my spirit. It is a great honor for me to receive all these benefits from studying the Art of Arms. I testify that V.S. gave the world the wisdom of his outstanding mind. This is only the smallest praise of his dignity, honor and Immortal Glory. In this way, subsequent generations of Knights can enter into this deadly life. This story is written in accursed language, which through the ages has conveyed all its wisdom of using weapons. This unusual language is the language of the heart in which all causes are entrenched and, thus, its fear goes away. After that I fell into the labyrinth of the curse with evil judgments and dishonor, but ultimately I kissed the hands of V.S. and every time I give infinite thanks to Heaven"

— School, June 20, 1653, with a Pure Heart, Anonymous Pupil

The treatise "The Art of Excellent Sword Hold" reflects Francesco Alfieri's thoughts and opinions on fencing.The author described the complete basic set of ways and methods, and the advantages that a person can gain in combat and in everyday life from studying the Art of Arms. Alfieri was one of the few authors to describe how the art of fencing can be made useful and how to become a master. The treatise is written in the language of the heart, as the followers of Alfieri say, in which the causes and principles of fencing grow, as fear and insecurity in combat disappear.

Alfieri is considered an unsurpassed master of fencing. His practice and experience in science led to the development of his new Mixed Martial position.

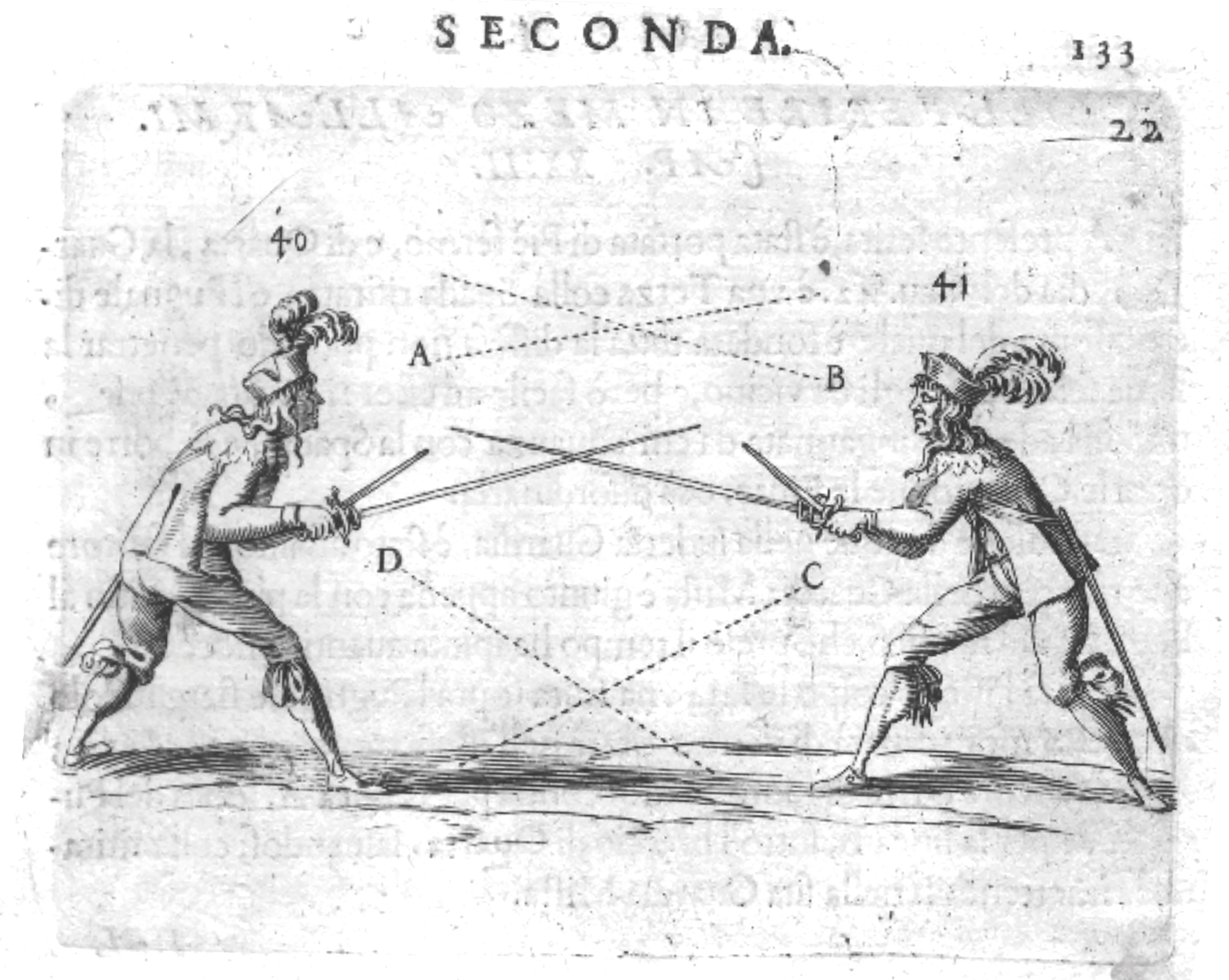
A mixed military position, introduced by Francesco Alfieri

The mixed combat position is a proportional position suitable for moving into the Counterblow position against the First, Second, Third, and Fourth combat positions. Also, here fencers can use a high position form, for example, to reject a blow in the Third position - outward or in the inner part. The fencer then needs to take the fourth battle position. The enemy will not be able to free himself, which is very important for striking. In this situation, it is harmful to perform direct movements, as they can be fatal. If the fencer doesn't want to be stabbed, they can find a way to change the shape, and then continue fencing. In this case, it is better to do everything in order to maintain a favorable position without any restrictions. When it is convenient, the fencer can attack a closer open part of the opponent's body.

This Mixed martial position allowed Alfieri to end all fights with a victory, so he preferred to use it more often than most others, and for protection and for striking the opponent. In addition, the author examined the main types of weapons that were most used at that time, and considered separately the features of their use, principles and true purpose, along with his observations and conclusions from practice. The weapons in question are a sword, a dagger, a dropon, a kapa, a targa, a broker, namely in a treatise such topics as:

First part:

- Basic principles of fencing.
- On the formation of the knight.
- On the forms of art.
- Methods of determining the shape.
- About time in art.
- On the combat positions.
- About moving the body and steps.
- On the features of the first and second combat positions.
- About the Third and Fourth Combat Positions and their advantages.
- On deviations and their varieties.
- About feints.
- How one can understand the nature and art of the enemy.
- What one needs to counteract the shock when the legs are still or in a step.
- On the Counterboy Position.
- Where one needs to be in combat.
- Ways to strike and the nature of the blows.
- How to deal with shy, reckless, phlegmatic and choleric.
- The advantages between strength and weakness.
- Advantages between big and small.
- The choice between the movement in the fighting position and the waiting.

The second and third parts of the treatise Francesco Alfieri are devoted to a detailed consideration of such topics as:

- Formation of combat positions, attack and defense.
- Inflicting various blows with a sword, a sword and a dagger, a dropon, etc. in different positions.
- Separately examined the types of protective weapons and how to use them.
- Controls from the dropdown, as well as the ways and methods of using this weapon in defense and attack, along with management features.

The treatise contains illustrations with detailed explanations and demonstrations of combat positions and how attacks are struck, and how attack and defense are carried out.

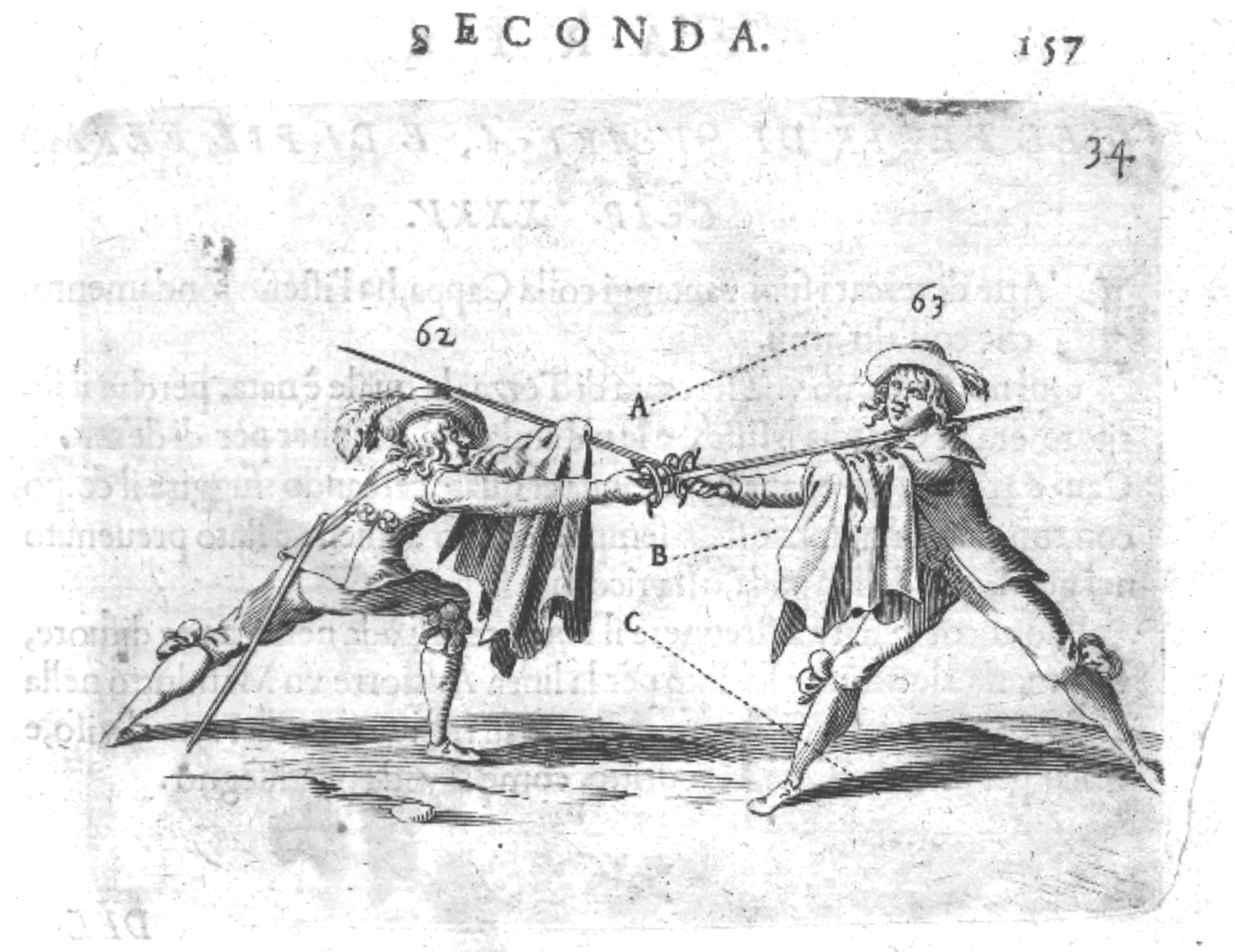
On striking with fixed feet with a sword and a cap

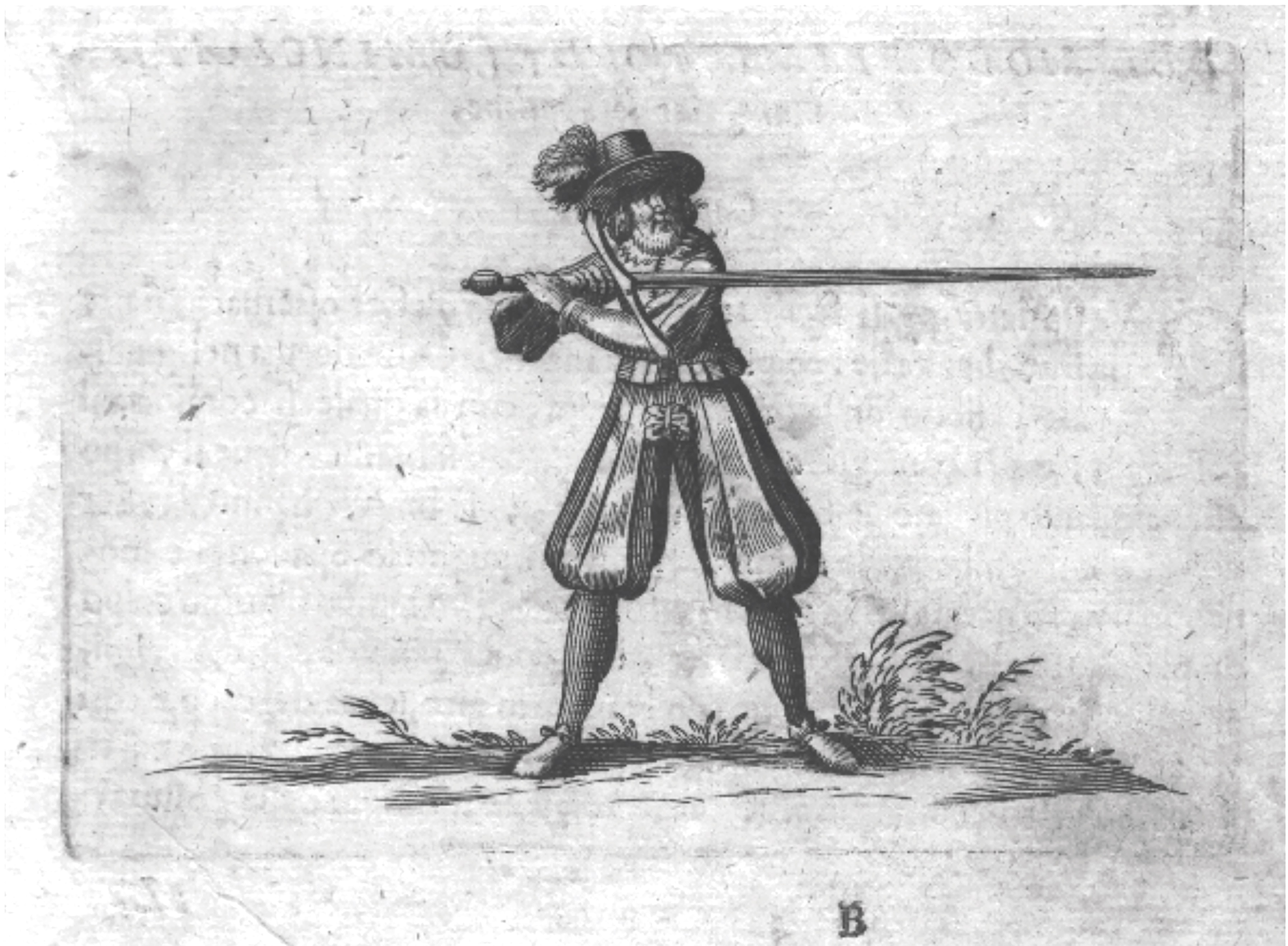
On the use of the tip and the application of cutting strokes with a dropdown

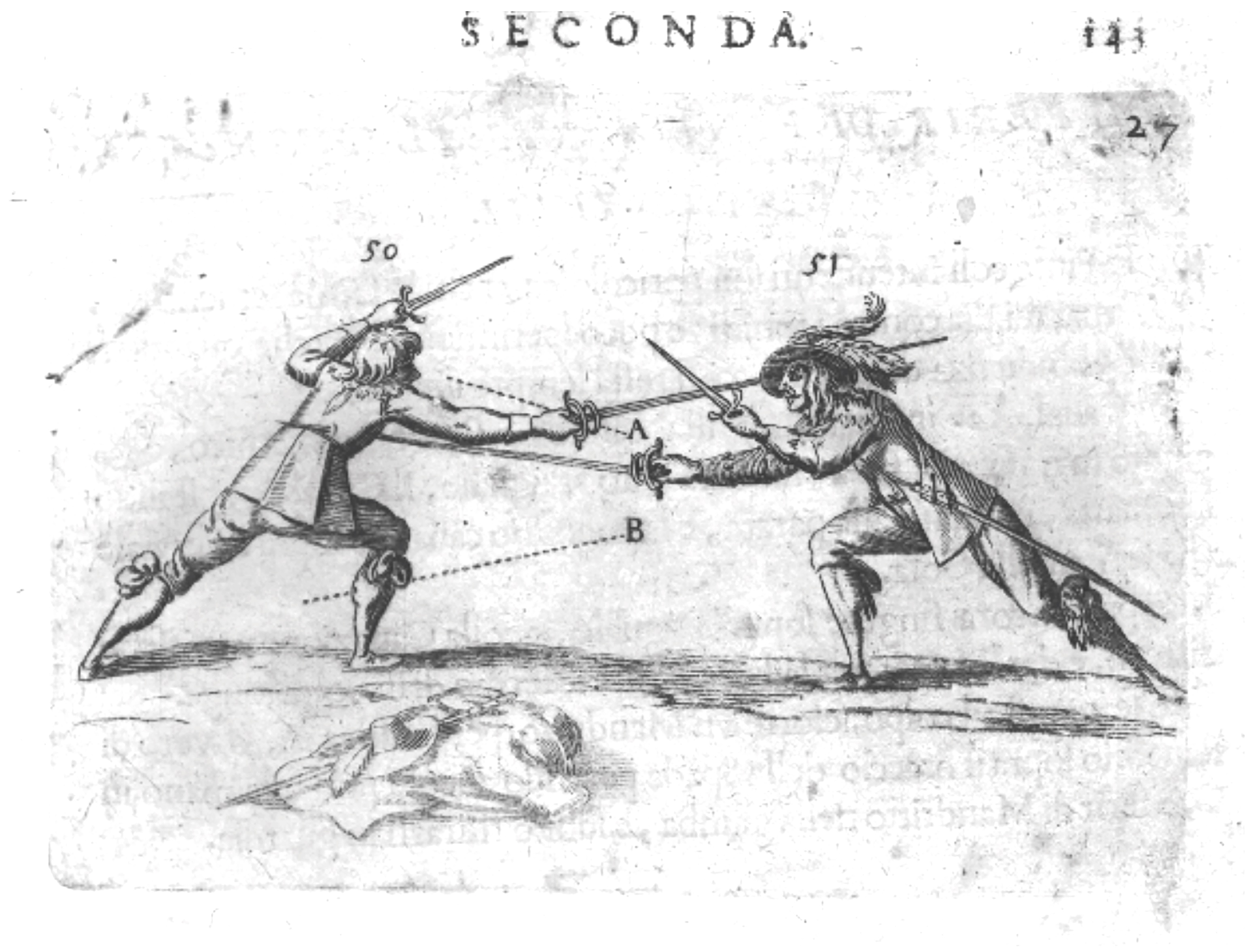
Parry and strike simultaneously

== Features and distinctive features in Italian fencing ==
Alfieri's treatise "The art of excellent possession of the sword" laid the foundation of Italian fencing. In his work, he draws attention to such features and distinctive features in Italian fencing:

- The attack is equal to the defense. There is no separation between attack and defense - parrying is not carried out separately. There is a work with a straight line. When the enemy strikes, he passes by, and the swordsman at this point in time strikes. This method is used provided the knowledge of the sword device, its separation, the ability to work with a brush and forearm, as well as on the understanding of how to control the sword of the enemy in battle.
- Blocking the movement of the opponent's free hand with his sword. This element is absent in other schools of fencing.
- Blocking the sword by hand. At that moment in time when a person strikes a piercing blow, the movement of the sword is inserted, as an obstacle, put out his hand in the glove, then the sword of the enemy begins to slip and go past. Further, the fencer with the other hand can freely apply the necessary blows. Francesco Alfieri in his work describes the mechanisms of the movement of the body or the ways of setting the enemy in a position where the fencer takes the sword to the opponent, unlike the other. A distinctive feature of this fencing is that this effect is achieved with the help of a straight line, and not at an angle, as in other schools of fencing.
- Beat on the rotation. The use of the rotation motions of the column, formed when the body turns, is described quite a lot. The sword is skipped and a blow is struck on the rotation of the body. Also demonstrated how to disarm the enemy.
- Strikes under the sword (from under the sword) of the enemy.

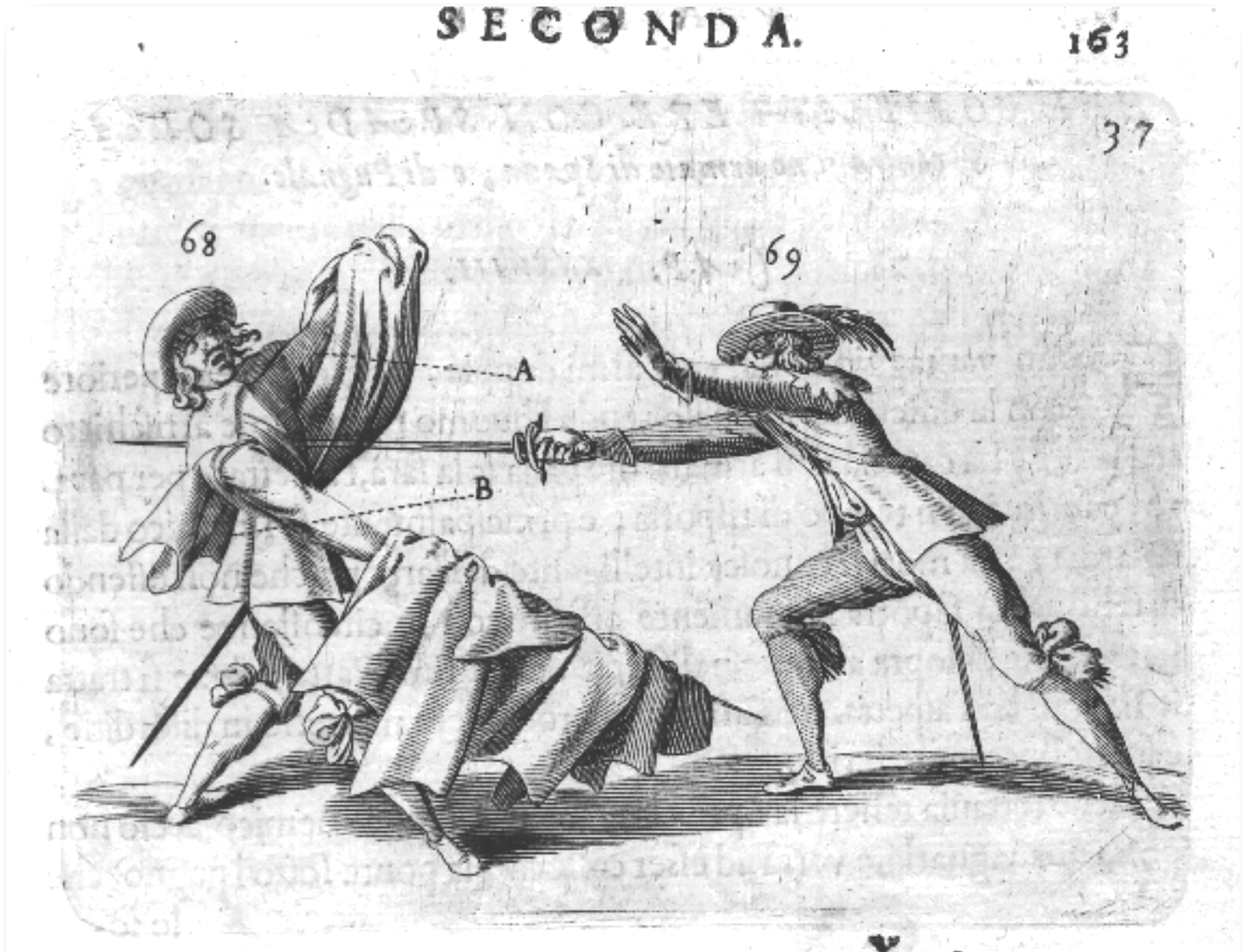
Striking in the fourth combat position with the lifting of the coiled raincoat

- Opposing the sword of the dagger. Of course, the dagger is shorter than the sword, so the dagger is parried with an executed attack with a sword. And since the dagger does not reach the body of the opponent, then the sword is struck exactly in the direction where the dagger is.
- Parrying on the cross. Simultaneous parry with a dagger and sword.
- Simultaneous striking with a dagger and a sword.
- Practically there are no cutting and cutting blows.
- In the main, punches are applied.
- Winding a raincoat on ones hand, which is used for protective purposes as a shield, which is typical of the Italian school of fencing.
- Use a mixed fighting position with a cloak that is wrapped around the arm, and a sword. A wounded raincoat is set against the sword to protect itself from an enemy attack, and then a fatal wound is inflicted.
- Use in defense and attack, throwing a cloak on a sword.

== Approach and reputation ==
Alfieri was the first Italian swordsmanship author to amply quote, reference and comment on earlier masters. For instance, he was an ardent admirer of earlier Paduan sword master Salvator Fabris, whom he calls "a man of the greatest name in our profession." On the other hand, he sharply criticizes Achille Marozzo and Ridolfo Capoferro and strongly disagrees with some of their positions.

In turn, Alfieri was amply quoted and praised by the late 17th-century Italian swordsmanship master Francesco Antonio Marcelli, giving an indication that his teaching enjoyed some popularity in the 17th century.

== See also ==
- Salvator Fabris
- Ridolfo Capo Ferro

== Bibliography ==
- Francesco Fernando Alfieri (1653). L'Arte Di Ben Maneggiare la Spada ... Nouamente Riueduta E Corretta ... Con L'aggiunta Dello Spadone. [With Plates.] Padova. p. 168.
- Francesco Fernando Alfieri (2017). Мистецтво чудового володіння мечем [The Art of Excellent Swordplay]. Dnipro: Середняк Т. К. p. 168. ISBN 978-617-7479-81-8.
- Thomas A. Green, Joseph R. Svinth (2010). Martial Arts of the World: An Encyclopedia of History and Innovation [2 volumes]: An Encyclopedia of History and Innovation. ABC-CLIO. p. 663.
- Blasco Florio (1844). La scienza della scherma esposta da Blasco Florio. Tipografia del R. ospizio di beneficienza. p. 230.
- Francesco Fernando Alfieri (1638). La bandiera. Sardi. p. 63.
- Francesco Fernando Alfieri (1640). La scherma. Dove con nove ragioni e con figure si mostra la perfezione di quest' arte (etc.). Sebastiano Sardi. p. 168.
- Francesco Fernando Alfieri (1641). La Picca, E la Bandiera ... Nella Quale Si Mostra Per Via Di Figure Una Facile ... Pratica, & Il Maneggio, E L'uso Di Essa, Con la Diffesa Della Spada. [With Plates.] Sebastiano Sardi. p. 63.
- Pompeo Gherardo Molmenti [in Italian] (1908). La storia di Venezia nella vita privata dalle origini alla caduta della Republica. Sebastiano Sardi.
- Giovanni Gentile, Calogero Tumminelli (1939). Enciclopedia italiana di scienze, lettere ed arti. Istituto Giovanni Treccani.
