= Paul Colombani =

American pediatric surgeon

Paul Michael Colombani is an American pediatric surgeon.

Colombani earned his medical degree from the University of Kentucky College of Medicine and completed residencies specializing in general surgery and pediatric surgery at the George Washington University School of Medicine and Johns Hopkins University School of Medicine, respectively. He then joined the Johns Hopkins School of Medicine faculty, where he taught as Robert Garrett Professor of Pediatric Surgery. Colombani later earned a master's in business administration from Johns Hopkins University.

In 2018, Paul Colombani resigned as surgery department chair of Johns Hopkins, and his name was removed from the hospital's website. He resigned following an investigation of a sharp rise in the deaths of children at All Children's Hospital, which joined JHU in 2010. In 2019, an independent investigation was commenced by a former federal prosecutor.

In 2008, Colombani was named in a lawsuit in which an esteemed female doctor alleged gender discrimination and bullying. The parties settled.
