= Gladiatoria =

15th-century German combat manual

Gladiatoria Group
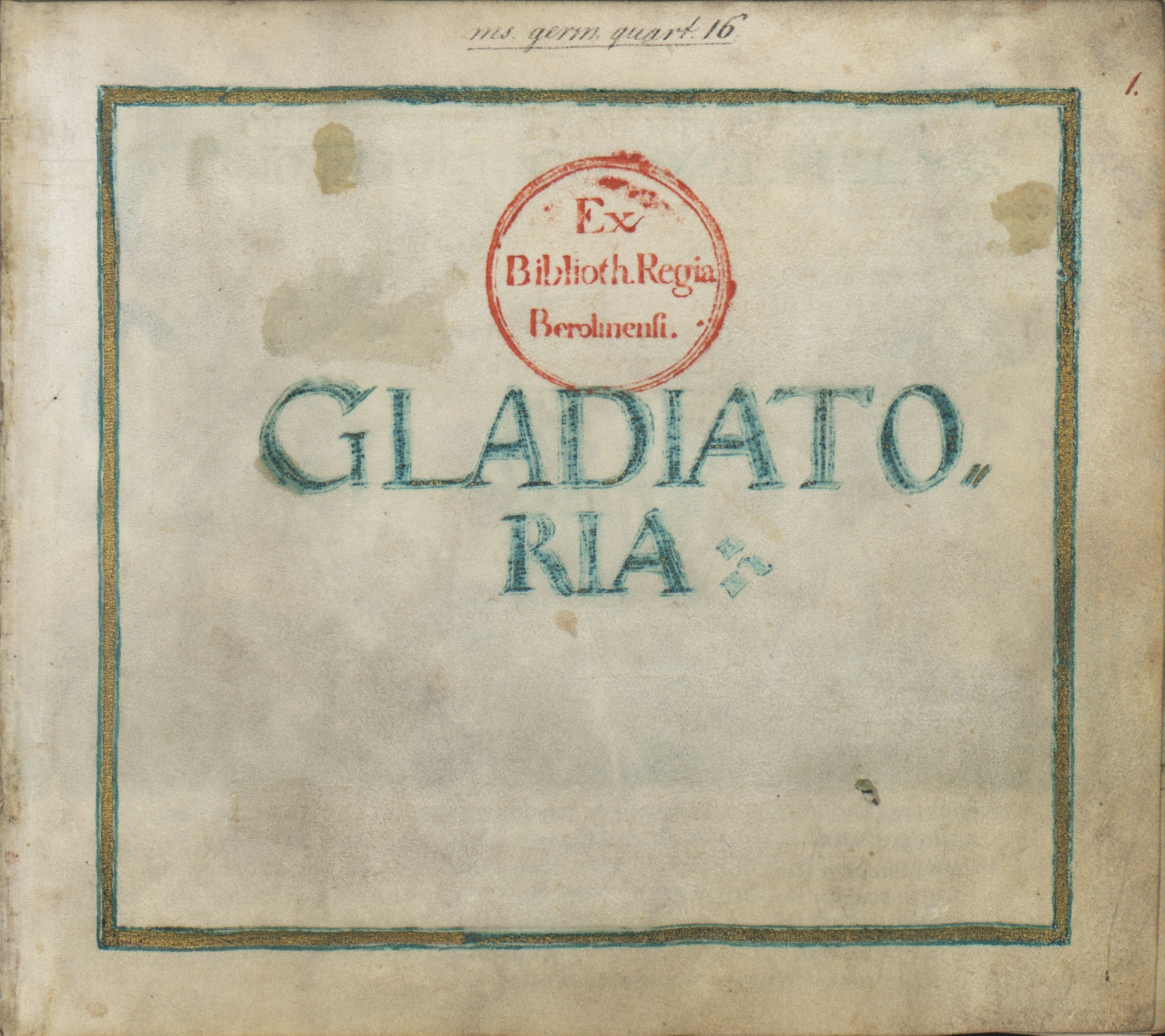
- Author(s): Unknown
- Illustrated by: Unknown
- Patron: Unknown
- Language: Early New High German
- Date: ca. 1430s
- State of existence: Archetype hypothetical; several incomplete copies exist
- Manuscript(s): List of manuscripts: Ms.KK5013 (1430s); Ms.Germ.Quart.16 (1435-1440); Ms.U860.F46 1450 (1440s); Cod.Guelf.78.2.Aug.2º (1465-1480); Ms.CL23842 (1490s)
- First printed edition: Knight, 2008
- Genre: Fencing manual

The Gladiatoria Group is a series of several 15th-century German manuscripts that share the same art style and cover the same material—various types of armored combat. The texts are contemporary with the tradition of Johannes Liechtenauer, but not directly influenced by it. Gladiatoria is thus one of very few glimpses into the characteristics of a potentially independent German martial tradition.

The core of the Gladiatoria group is a series of devices of armored fencing following the typical progression of a judicial duel: beginning with spears and small shields called ecranches, moving to longswords, then employing daggers on foot and on the ground. (Traditional dueling would begin on horseback before going to foot combat, and the ecranche is designed for mounted fencing, but Gladiatoria skips that stage entirely.) The diverse manuscripts in the group generally describe other kinds of fighting as well, such as the sword and buckler of the Codex Guelf 78.2 August 2º or the longshield of the Ms. German Quarto 16, but these teachings lack some of the common elements of the core Gladiatoria complex and are not considered to be part of it.

There are five known versions of the Gladiatoria treatise, found in the Ms. KK5013, the Ms. German Quarto 16 (the only version with a title page), the Ms. U860.F46 1450, the Codex Guelf 78.2 August 2º, and the Ms. CL23842. Hans-Peter Hils described a sixth lost manuscript identified as Ms. T in his 1987 edition of Gladiatoria, but this was later determined to be identical with the MS U860 F46 1450 (which Hils did not have access to). Aside from these five, there are a few other extant manuscripts that some scholars have ascribed to the group. These include the Cod.11093 and part C of the Codex Wallerstein. In each case, there are disqualifying factors that ultimately exclude them from the group.

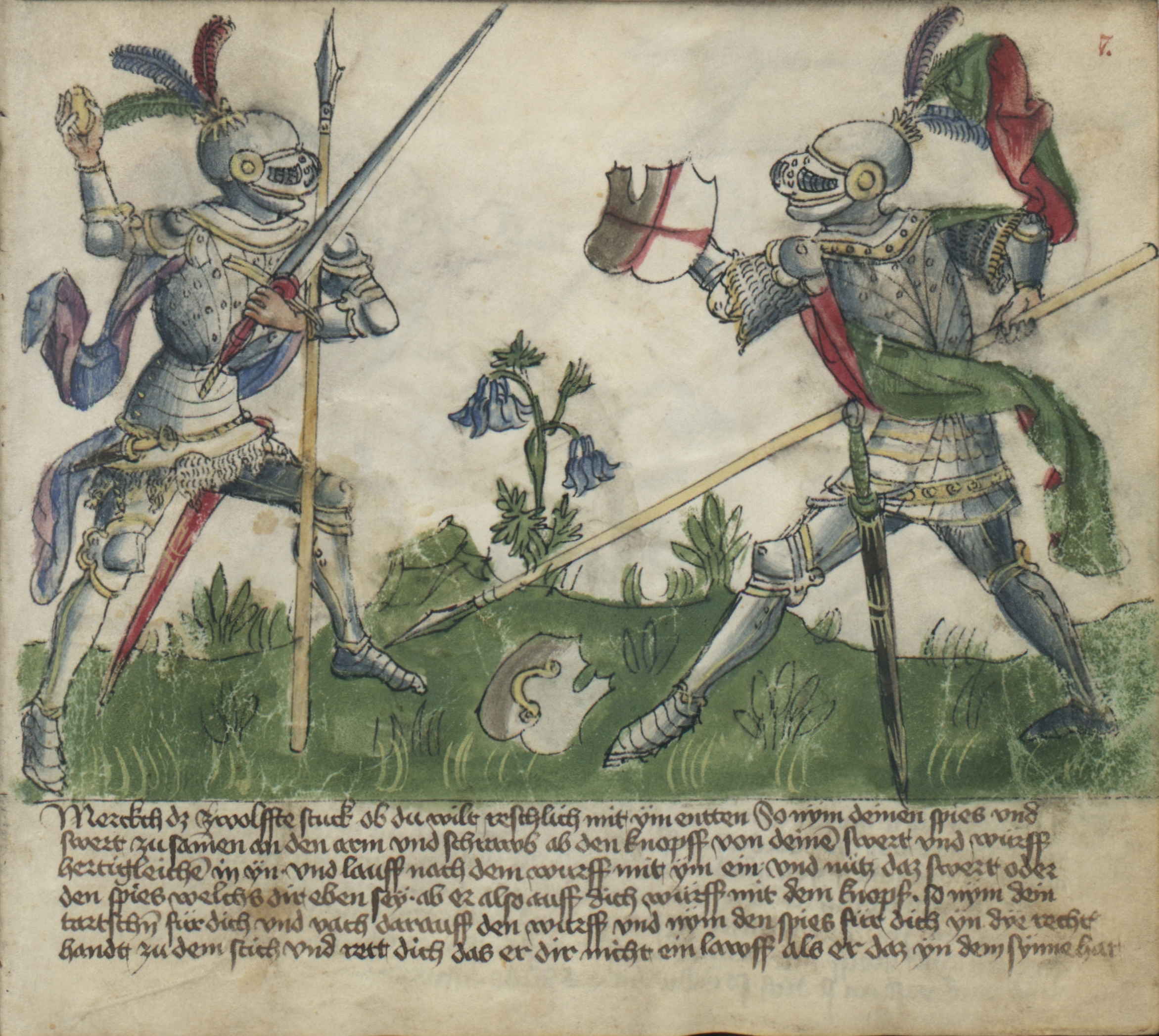
The depiction of the pommel throwing technique.

While the three oldest texts in the Gladiatoria complex present a fairly identical set of devices, the slightly later Wolfenbüttel version of the treatise contains significantly more material, primarily in the dagger section. The origin of this additional material is unknown, and the textless nature of that version makes it difficult to place these plays in any sort of context. However, their existence may signify that the archetype was much more extensive than any known copy.

The manuscripts have received much attention online for a bizarre suggestion in its description of sword fighting that involves removing the pommel of the longsword and throwing it at the opponent.

== Gallery ==
Here is a selection of images from the Ms. Germ. Quart. 16.

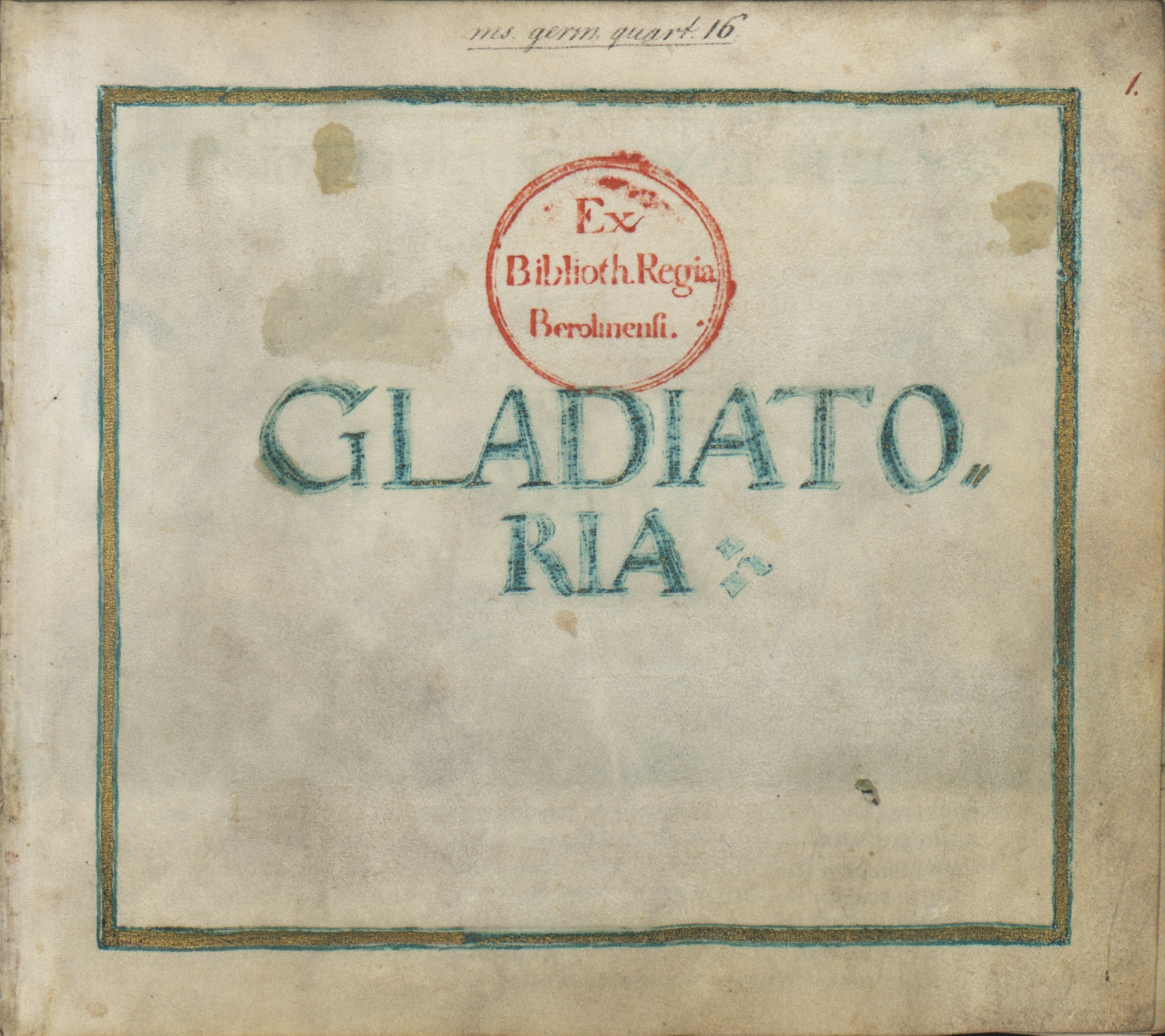

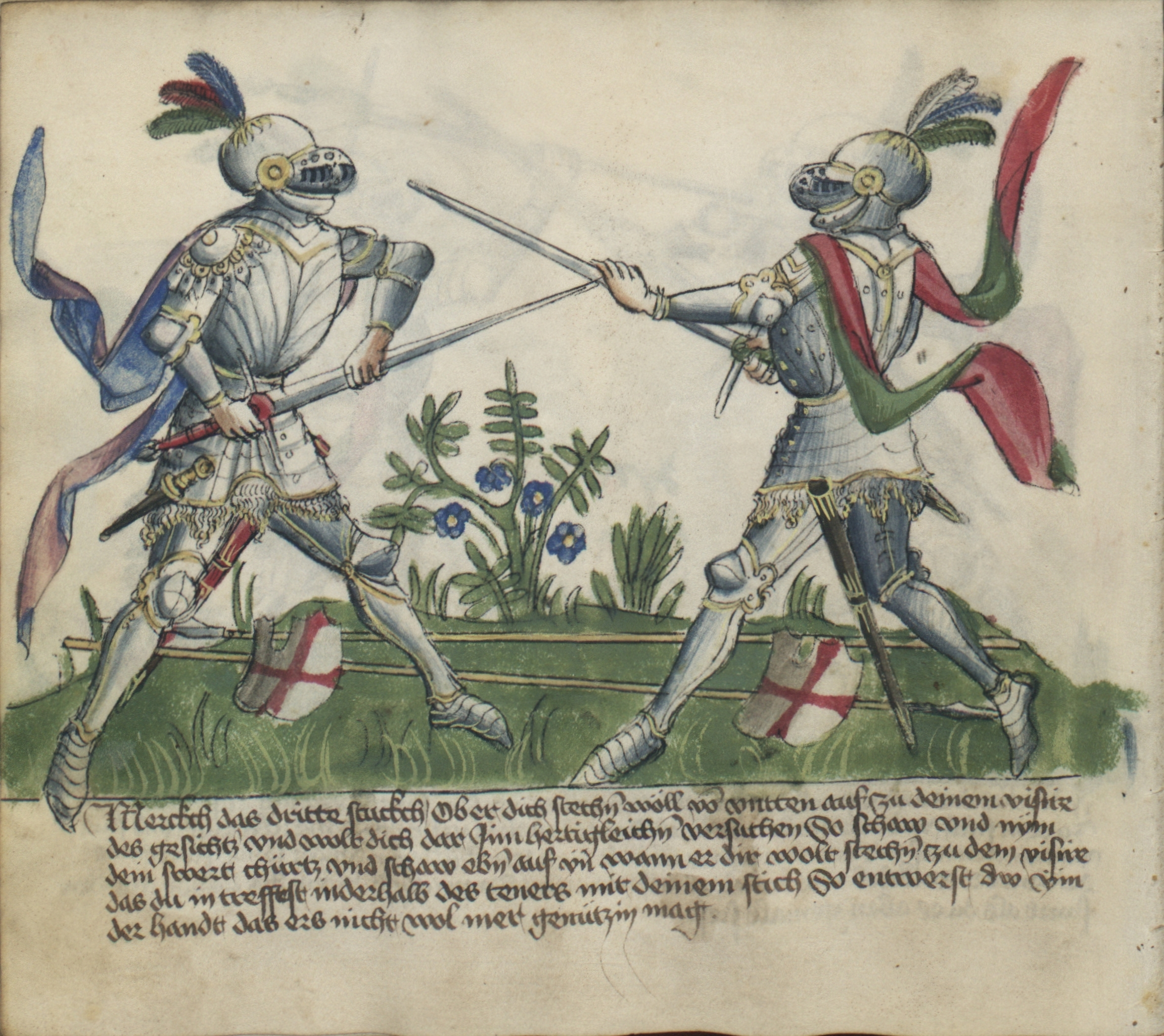

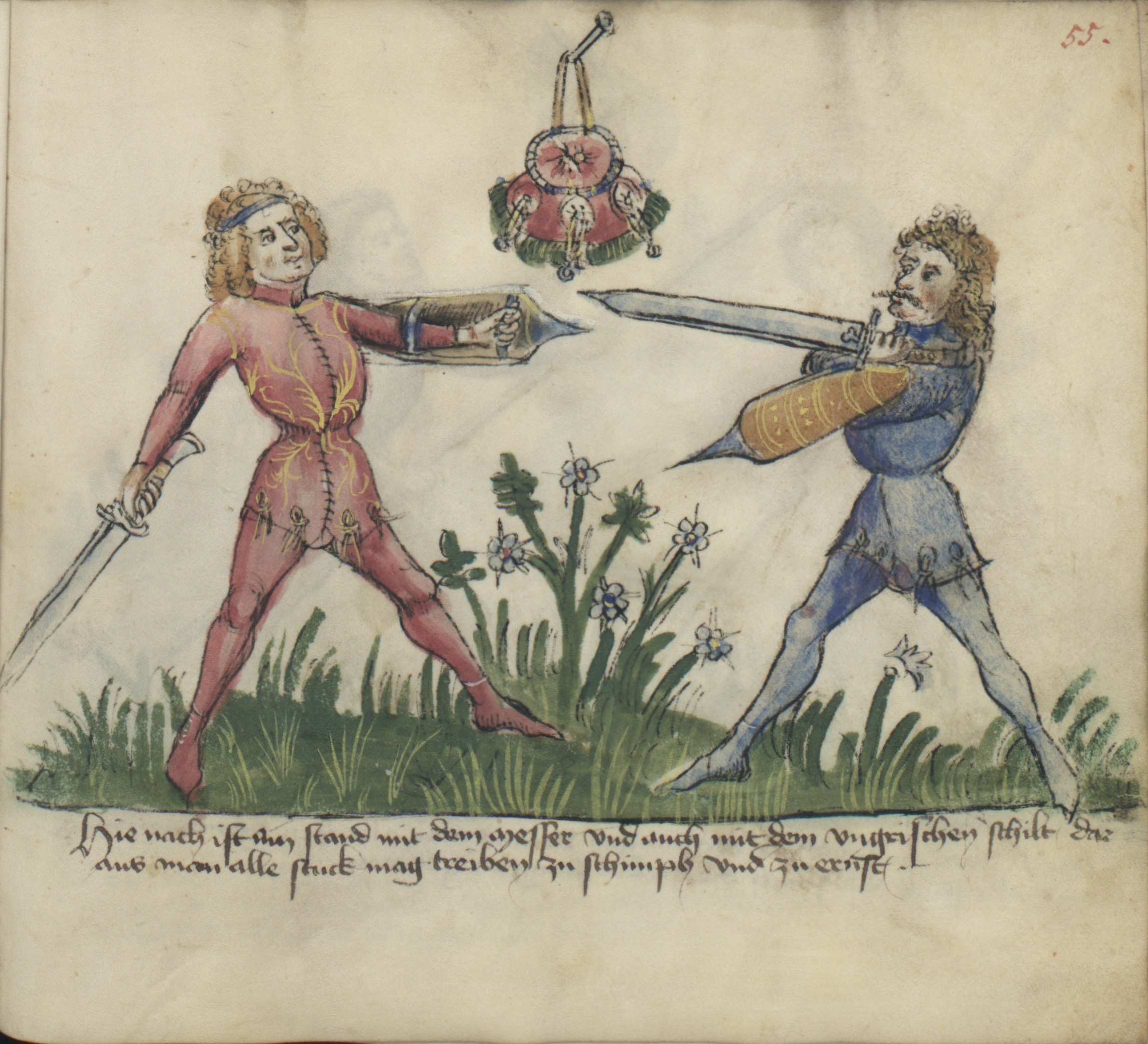

== Additional Resources ==
- Hils, Hans-Peter. "Gladiatoria: Über drei Fechthandschriften aus der ersten Hälfte des 15. Jahrhunderts." Codices manuscripti. Issue 13, 1987.
- Knight, Hugh T. Jr. The Gladiatoria Fechtbuch: A Fifteenth-Century German Fight Book. Lulu.com, 2008.
- Walczak, Bartłomiej. "Judicial Armoured Dagger Combat of Gladiatoria and KK 5013." Masters of Medieval and Renaissance Martial Arts. Ed. Jeffrey Hull. Boulder, CO: Paladin Press, 2008. ISBN 978-1-58160-668-3
