= Martial arts manual =

Instructions on how to fight

Martial arts manuals are instructions, with or without illustrations, specifically designed to be learnt from a book. Many books detailing specific techniques of martial arts are often erroneously called manuals but were written as treatises.

Prose descriptions of martial arts techniques appear late within the history of literature, due to the inherent difficulties of describing a technique rather than just demonstrating it.

The earliest extant manuscript on armed combat (as opposed to unarmed wrestling) is Royal Armouries Ms. I.33 ("I.33"), written in Franconia around 1300.

Not within the scope of this article are books on military strategy such as Sun Tzu's The Art of War (before 100 BCE) or Publius Flavius Vegetius Renatus' De Re Militari (4th century), or military technology, such as De rebus bellicis (4th to 5th century).

== Predecessors ==
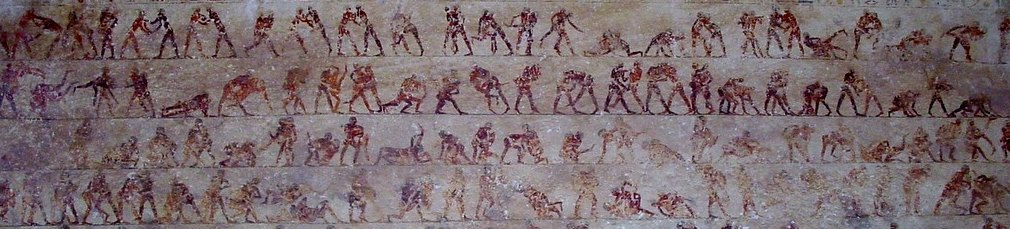
Detail of the wrestling scenes at Beni Hasan.

Some early testimonies of historical martial arts consist of series of images only. The earliest example is a fresco in tomb 15 at Beni Hasan, showing illustrations of wrestling techniques dating to the 20th century BCE. Similar depictions of wrestling techniques are found on Attic vases dating to Classical Greece.

The only known instance of a book from classical antiquity is Papyrus Oxyrhynchus 466 from the 2nd century CE, detailing Greek wrestling techniques.

There are some examples in the Chinese classics that may predate the turn of the Common Era: the Records of the Grand Historian by Sima Qian (c. 100 BCE) documents wrestling, referring to earlier how-to manuals of the Western Han (2nd century BCE), which have however not survived. An extant Chinese text on wrestling is "Six Chapters of Hand Fighting" included in the 1st-century CE Book of Han.

All other extant manuals date to the Middle Ages or later.

The "combat stele" at the Shaolin Monastery dates to 728 CE.

The earliest text detailing Indian martial arts is the Agni Purana (c. 8th century), which contains several chapters giving descriptions and instructions on fighting techniques. It described how to improve a warrior's individual prowess and kill enemies using various methods in warfare whether they went to war in chariots, horses, elephants or on foot. Foot methods were subdivided into armed combat and unarmed combat. The former included the bow and arrow, the sword, spear, noose, armour, iron dart, club, battle axe, chakram and trident. The latter included wrestling, knee strikes, punching and kicking methods.

The oldest extant European martial arts manual is Royal Armouries Ms. I.33 (c. 1300).

"Illustrations only" manuals do not become extinct with the appearance of prose instructions, but rather exist alongside these, e.g. in the form of the Late Medieval German illuminated manuscripts.

== Historical European martial arts ==
=== German Fechtbücher ===
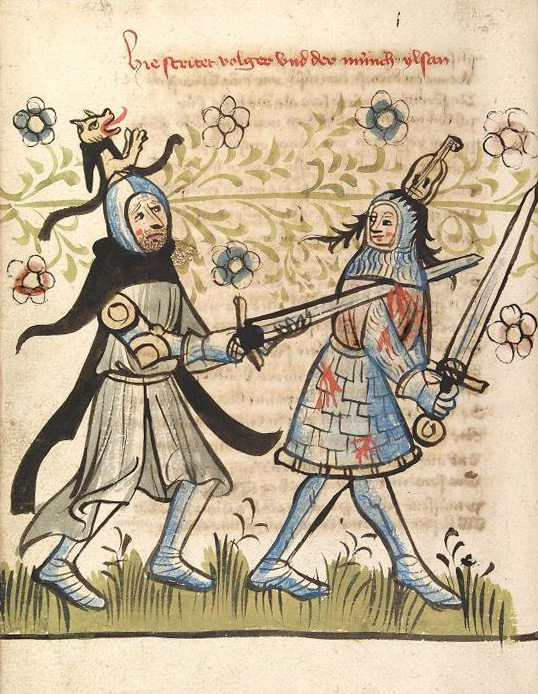
Example of an illustration of half-sword, c. 1418: Islan the monk executes a half-sword thrust against Volker the minstrel (CPG 359, fol. 46v).

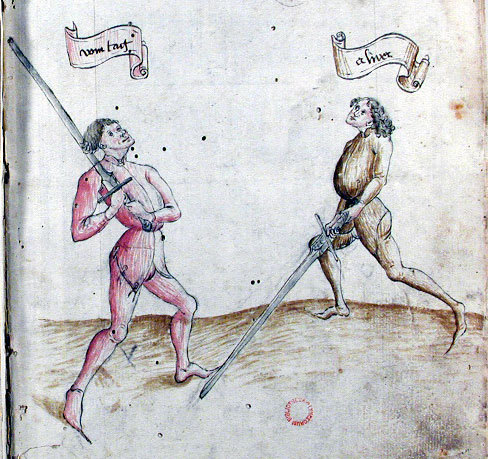
fol. 2r of the Cod. 44 A 8, depicting two fencers in the vom tag and alber wards.

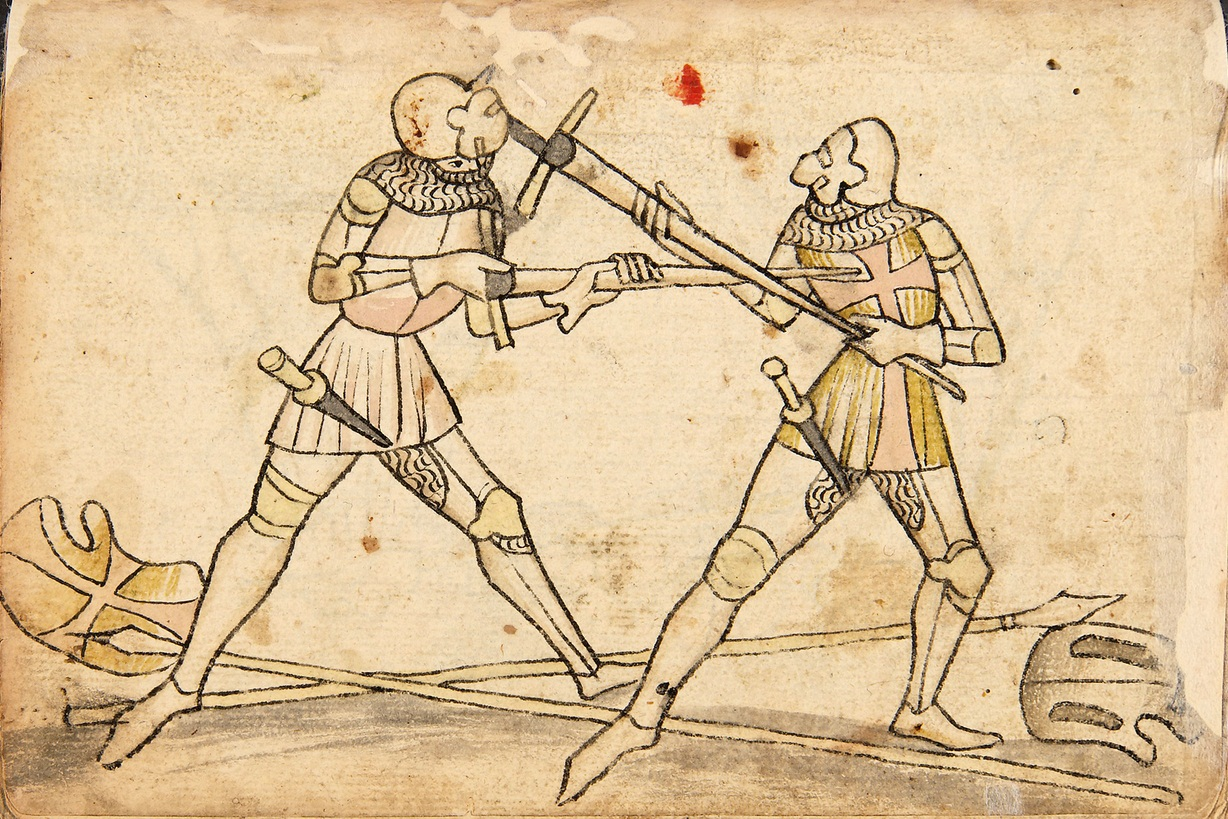
Illustration of a half-sword thrust against a mordhau in armoured longsword combat. (Plate 214) Codex Wallerstein.

Fechtbuch (plural Fechtbücher) is Early New High German for 'combat manual', (Note: fechten is cognate to English fight and still meant "fight, combat" in general in Early Modern times; in contemporary Standard German, fechten translates to "fencing", while the noun Gefecht retains the generic meaning of "fight, battle".) one of the manuscripts or printed books of the late Middle Ages and the Renaissance containing descriptions of a martial art. The term is usually taken to include 15th- and 16th-century German manuals, but the nature of the subject matter does not allow a clear separation of these from treatises from other parts of Europe on one hand (particularly from the Italian and French schools), and from manuals of later centuries on the other hand.

Notable Fechtbücher include:

- Royal Armouries Ms. I.33 ("Walpurgis Manuscript") (c. 1300, predating Johannes Liechtenauer)
- Hanko Döbringer, Cod.ms.3227a (1389)
- Nürnberger Handschrift GNM 3227a (c. 1389)
- Fechtbuch of Sigmund Ringeck (1440s)
- Codex Vindobonensis B 11093, kept in Vienna, and "Gladiatoria", discovered in Poland, both dating to the mid-15th century and largely uninfluenced by Liechtenauer.
- Fechtbücher of Hans Talhoffer (several surviving manuscripts dating from 1443–1467).
- Fechtbuch of Peter von Danzig, Cod. 44 A 8, 1452
- Jud Lew Cod.I.6.4°.3 (1450s), Augsburg
- Fechtbuch of Paulus Kal (1460s)
- Cgm 558, a Swiss treatise of the later 15th century only loosely related to the German school.
- Codex Wallerstein (Vom Baumans Fechtbuch), 1470s, Augsburg
- Solothurner Fechtbuch, no text, dependent on Paulus Kal, 1470s, Solothurn
- Johannes Lecküchner Cod. Pal. Germ. 430, Heidelberg (1478), Cgm. 582, Munich (1482)
- Cod. Guelf. 78.2, Herzog August Bibliothek Wolfenbüttel (late 15th century)
- Peter Falkner P 5012, Kunsthistorisches Museum, Vienna
- Hans Folz Q566 (c. 1480), Weimar
- Hans von Speyer (MS M I 29) (1491)
- Cluny Fechtbuch, c. 1500, influenced by Kal and Falkner, drawn upon by Wilhalm.
- Glasgow Fechtbuch (1505)
- Hans Wurm, grappling, (c. 1505)
- "Goliath (manuscript)" (1510s)
- Albrecht Dürer's fechtbuch HS. 26-232 (1512), Michigan State University
- Andre Pauernfeindt, Ergründung der ritterlichen kunst des fechtens durch freyfechter czu Vienn, Vienna, 1516
- Cologne Fechtbuch, anonymous (early 16th century)
- Fechtbücher by Jörg Wilhalm (1520s)
- Egenolph: Der Altenn Fechter anfaengliche Kunst, anonymous, printed by Christian Egenolff, 1529, Frankfurt. This is largely derived from Pauernfeindt's 1516 manual.
- Hans Czynner MS. 963 (1538), Graz
- the compendia of Paulus Hector Mair (1540s).
- Johannes Lecküchner (1558) (this is a reprint from the Altenn Fechter anfaengliche Kunst, printed by Egenolph).
- Joachim Meyer "Gründtliche Beschreibung der freyen Ritterlichen vnnd Adelichen kunst des Fechtens in allerley gebreuchlichen Wehren mit vil schönen vnd nützlichen Figuren gezieret vnnd fürgestellet" (1570)
- Gunterrodt: "De veris principiis artis dimicatoriae" (1579), Wittenberg
- Codex Guelf. 83.4 (c. 1591)
- Jakob Sutor von Baden (1612)

=== Italian treatises ===
The Italian school is attested in an early manual of 1410, at which time it is not yet clearly separable from the German school. Indeed, the author Fiore dei Liberi states that he has learned much of his art from one "Master Johannes of Swabia". The heyday of the Italian school comes in the 16th century, with the Dardi school.

- Fiore dei Liberi's Flos Duellatorum (1410)
- Filippo Vadi's De Arte Gladiatoria Dimicandi (1485)
- Pietro Monte (1509)
- Anonimo Bolognese M-345/6 (c. 1510s)
- Antonio Manciolino (1531)
- Achille Marozzo (1536)
- Camillo Agrippa, Trattato di Scienza d'Arme (1568)
- Giacomo di Grassi, His True Art of Defense (1594)
- Vincentio Saviolo, His Practice (1595)
- Salvator Fabris (1606)
- Ridolfo Capo Ferro (1610)
- Francesco Alfieri, La Scherma (1640)
- Giuseppe Colombani (1711)

=== French manuals ===
Similar to the situation in Italy, there is one early manual (c. 1400, dealing with the pollaxe exclusively), and later treatises appear only after a gap of more than a century.

- Le jeu de la hache (c. 1400)
- Andre Pauernfeindt, La noble science des joueurs d'espee (1528)—This is a French translation of Pauernfeindt's 1516 work. One notable difference between it and the original is that the "noble science" print has colored images, unlike the German.
- Henry de Sainct-Didier, Traité contenant les secrets du premier livre de l'épée seule, mère de toutes les armes, qui sont épée, dague, cappe, targue, bouclier, rondelle, l'espée deux mains, et les deux espées, avec ses pourtraictures, ... (1573)
- Gérard Thibault d'Anvers, Académie de l'epee, ou se démontrent par reigles mathématique, sur le fondement d'un cercle mysterieux, la theorie et pratique des vrais et jusqu'a present incognus secrets du maniement des armes, à pied et a cheval (1623)
- Monsieur L'Abbat, The Art of Fencing, or, the Use of the Small Sword (1734)

=== British manuals ===
==== England ====
Apart from three rather opaque texts of the later 15th century, the native English tradition of fencing manuals begins with George Silver's Paradoxes of Defense (1599).

- Harley MS 3542 (The Man Who Wol), late 14th–early 15th century
- Cotton Titus, 15th-century English greatsword and staff
- Additional Manuscript 39564, 15th century
- George Silver, Paradoxes of Defense (1599)
- Joseph Swetnam, Schoole of the Noble and Worthy Science of Defence (1612)
- Captain John Godfrey, A Treatise Upon the Useful Science of Defence, Connecting the Small and Back-Sword (1747)
- John Musgrave Waite, Lessons in sabre, singlestick, sabre & bayonet, and sword feats (1880)
- Alfred Hutton, Cold Steel, A Practical Treatise on the Sabre (1889), Old Sword-Play (1892)

==== Scotland ====
Scottish manuals detailing the use of the basket-hilted Scottish broadsword, besides other disciplines such as the smallsword and spadroon, were published throughout the 18th century, with early and late examples dating to the late 17th and early 19th centuries, respectively:

- Sir William Hope, The Scots Fencing Master (the Complete Smallswordsman) (1687)
- Sir William Hope, Advice to his Scholar from the Fencing Master (1692)
- Sir William Hope, Complete Fencing Master (1691–1692)
- Sir William Hope, The Swordsman's Vade-Mecum (1692)
- Sir William Hope, New Short and Easy Method of Fencing (1st edition, 1707)
- Sir William Hope, New Short and Easy Method of Fencing (2nd edition, 1714)
- Sir William Hope, A Few Observations upon the Fighting for Prizes in the Bear Gardens (1715)
- Sir William Hope, A Vindication of the True Art of Self-Defence (1724)
- Donald McBane, Expert Swords-man's Companion (1728)
- Captain James Miller, A treatise on backsword, sword, buckler, sword and dagger, sword and great gauntlet, falchon, quarterstaff (1737)
- Thomas Page, The Use of the Broad Sword (1746)
- Captain G. Sinclair, Anti-Pugilism – Anonymous (1790)
- Captain G. Sinclair, Cudgel Playing Modernized and Improved; or, The Science of Defence, Exemplified in a Few Short and Easy Lessons, for the Practice of the Broad Sword or Single Stick, on Foot
- Archibald MacGregor, Lecture on the Art of Defence (1791)
- Thomas Rowlandson, The Guards of the Highland Broadsword (1799)
- Henry Angelo and son, Hungarian & Highland Broadsword (1799)
- John Taylor, The Art of Defence on Foot with Broadsword and Saber (1804)
- Thomas Mathewson, Fencing Familiarized; or, a New Treatise on the Art of the Scotch Broad Sword (1805)

=== Iberian manuals ===
There are some manuals containing training advice for the medieval tournament and jousting, such as the early Portuguese work A ensinança de bem cavalgar em toda a sela by Edward of Portugal (1391–1438), a riding instruction manual that also included martial information.

In 1599, the swordmaster Domingo Luis Godinho wrote the Arte de Esgrima, the only fencing manual that preserved the older "Common" or "Vulgar" system of Spanish fencing, which has its traditions in the Middle Ages.

17th-century Spanish destreza is steeped in the Spanish Baroque noblemen mindset, so it does not contain graphical explanations of the fencing techniques so much as explanations based on mathematics and philosophical sciences in general. The subsequent difficulty in interpreting the theory and practice of destreza correctly has frequently led to this school of fencing being misunderstood.

- Jerónimo Sánchez de Carranza, De la filosophia de las armas y de su destreza... (1582)
- Luis Pacheco de Narváez, Libro de las grandezas de la espada (1600)
- Gerard Thibault, Academie de l'espée (1628)
- Luis Pacheco de Narváez, Nueva ciencia (1632)
- Luis Méndez de Carmona Tamariz, Compendio en defensa de la doctrina y destreza del comendador Gerónimo de Carranza (1632)
- Luis Diáz de Viedma, Método de Enseñanza de Maestros (1639) and Epitome de la Enseñanza (1639)
- Cristóbal de Cala, Desengaño de la espada y norte de diestros (1642)
- Diogo Gomes de Figueyredo, Memorial da Prattica do Montante Que inclue dezaseis regras simplez (1651)
- Miguel Pérez de Mendoza y Quijada, Resumen de la verdadera destreza de las armas en treinta y ocho asserciones (1675)
- Francisco Antonio de Ettenhard y Abarca, Compendio de los fundamentos de la verdadera destreza y filosofia de las armas (1675)
- Álvaro Guerra de la Vega, Compreension de la destreza (1681)
- Thomas Luis, Tratado das liçoens da espada preta, & destreza que hao de usar os jugadores della (1685)
- Nicolás Tamariz, Cartilla y luz en la verdadera destreza (1696)
- Manuel Cruzado y Peralta, Las tretas de la vulgar y comun esgrima de espada sola y con armas dobles (1702)
- Francisco Lórenz de Rada, Nobleza de la espada (1705)
- Nicolás Rodrigo Noveli, Crisol especulativo, demostrativo, práctico, Matemático de la destreza (1731)
- Manuel Antonio de Brea, Principios universales y reglas generales de la verdadera destreza del espadín (1805)
- Jaime Mereló y Casademunt, Tratado completo de la esgrima del sable español (1862)

== Historical Asian martial arts ==
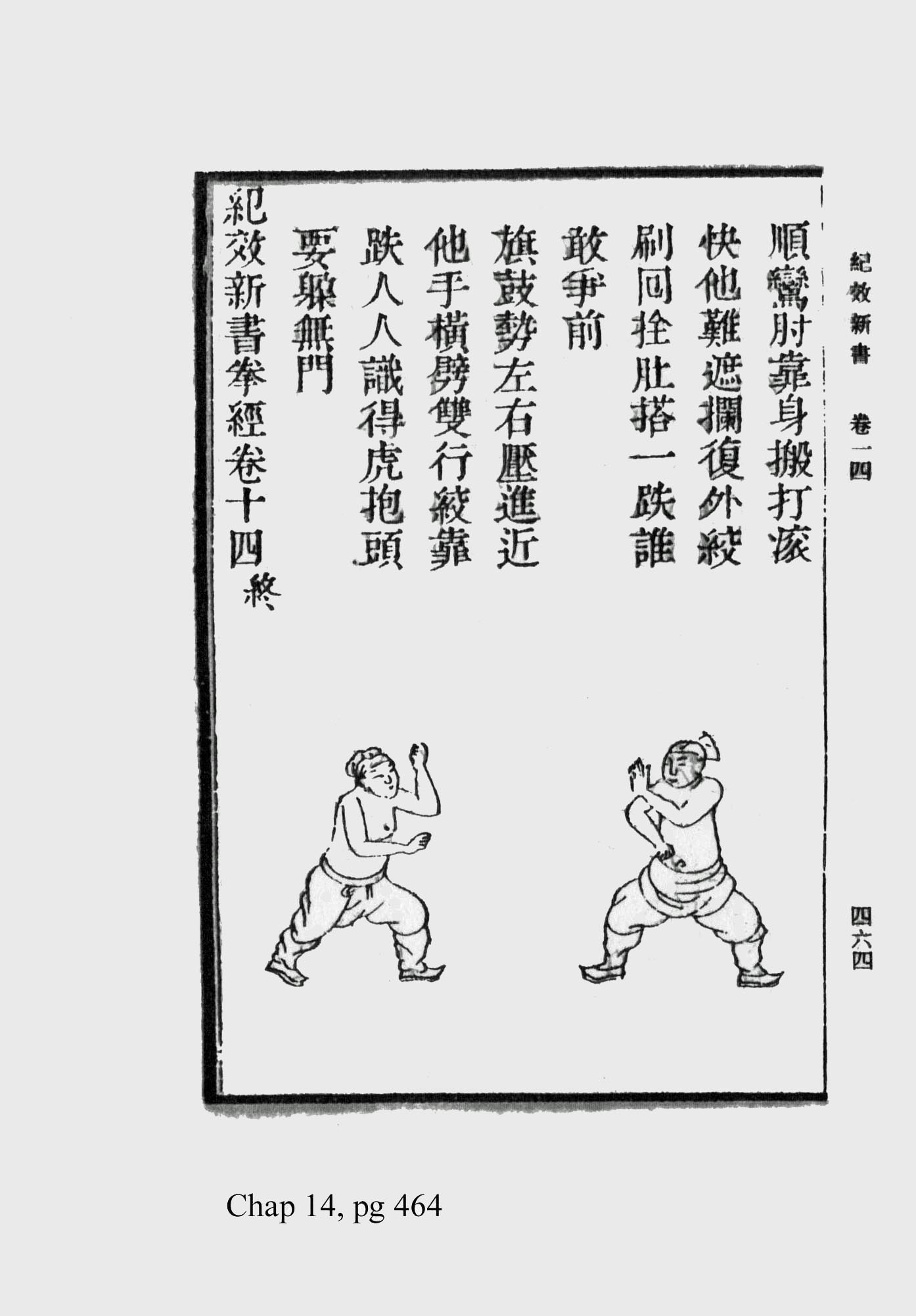
Unarmed fighting from the Jixiao Xinshu (1560s)

Some texts on unarmed combat survive from Han China (c. 1st century). A list of wrestling techniques is contained in the Malla Purana of 13th-century Gujarat, India. The Chinese Jixiao Xinshu dates to the 1560s. The Korean Muyejebo dates to 1598, the Muyedobotongji dates to 1790. The Japanese The Book of Five Rings dates to 1645.

== See also ==
- German school of fencing
- Martial arts timeline
