= Glasgow Fechtbuch =

Combat manual

The "seated fencing master" illustration of fol. 35r.

The Glasgow Fechtbuch (MS E.1939.65.341 in the R. L. Scott Collection of the Glasgow Museums in Glasgow, Scotland) is a combat manual of the German school of fencing, dated to 1505. Consisting of 105 folia, it combines the instructions of various masters of the 15th century who stood in the tradition of Johannes Liechtenauer, presumably based on a previous compilation made by fencing master Sigmund Schining ein Ringeck.

Contents:

Blossfechten (longsword and messer)

- 1r - 22r Gloss of Liechtenauer's longsword Blossfechten by Ringeck (fragment)
- 22v - 24r Additional longsword material by Ringeck
- 24v - 25r Longsword by Martin Syber
- 25v - 26v Messer treatise
- 27r - 29v Additional longsword material by Andres Juden, Jobs von der Nyssen, Nicolas Preussen, and Hans Döbringer (viz., the same "other masters" as referenced in MS 3227a)
- 35r (Image of a seated master, possibly Liechtenauer, reminiscent of the depiction in Cod. 44 A 8)

Ringen (grappling)

- 35v - 56r Grappling
- 64r - 66r Grappling by Andre Liegnitzer
- 67r - 73v Grappling by Ott Jud

Rossfechten (mounted combat)

- 74r - 82r Anonymous gloss of Liechtenauer's Rossfechten

Kampffechten (armoured combat) and dagger

- 83r Gloss of Liechtenauer's Kampffechten by Ringeck (one paragraph)
- 83r - 95v Anonymous gloss of Liechtenauer's Kampffechten (armoured combat)
- 95v - 97v Dagger by Martin Hundfeld
- 97v - 100r Dagger treatise
- 100v - 104v Armored combat by Martin Hundfeld

Sword and buckler

- 105r - 105v Sword and buckler by Andre Liegnitzer
