= Swordsmanship =

Skills of a person versed in the art of the sword

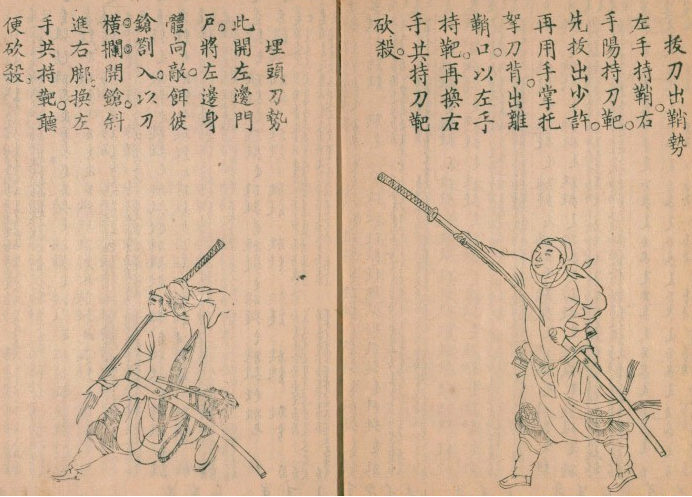
Depiction of Chinese swordsman wielding a single-edged sword, from the Dan Dao Fa Xuan, c. 1626

Swordsmanship or sword fighting refers to the skills and techniques used in combat and training with any type of sword. The term is modern, and as such was mainly used to refer to smallsword fencing, but by extension it can also be applied to any martial art involving the use of a sword. The formation of the English word "swordsman" is parallel to the Latin word gladiator, a term for the professional fighters who fought against each other and a variety of other foes for the entertainment of spectators in the Roman Empire. The word gladiator itself comes from the Latin word gladius, which is a type of sword.

== Europe ==
=== Classical history ===
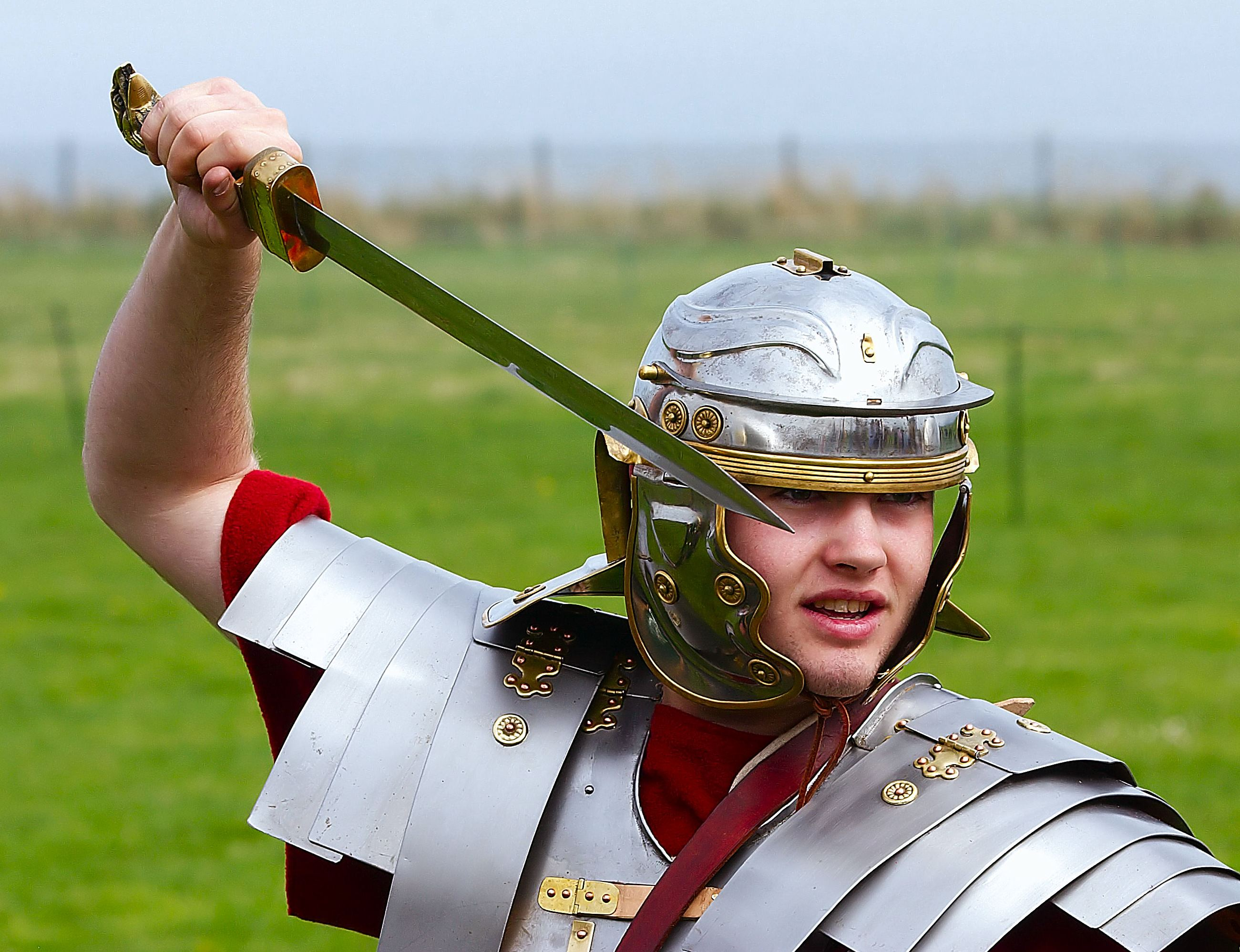
Re-enactor with a Roman gladius

The Roman legionaries and other forces of the Roman military, until the 2nd century A.D., used the gladius as a short thrusting sword effectively with the scutum, a type of shield, in battle. According to Vegetius, the Romans mainly used underhanded stabs and thrusts, because one thrust into the gut would kill an enemy faster than slashes or cutting. However, some depictions of Roman soldiers show them using slashing and cuts. Gladiators used a shorter gladius than the military. The spatha was a longer double-edged sword initially used only by Celtic soldiers, later incorporated as auxilia into Roman Cavalry units; however by the 2nd century A.D. the spatha was used throughout much of the Roman Empire.

The Empire's legionary soldiers were heavily trained and prided themselves on their disciplinary skills. This probably carried over to their training with weaponry, no Roman manuals of swordsmanship have survived. One translation of Juvenal's poetry by Barten Holyday published in 1661 makes note that the Roman trainees learned to fight with the wooden wasters before moving on to the use of sharpened steel. In fact, it is also found that Roman gladiators trained with a wooden sword, which was weighted with lead, against a straw man or a wooden pole known as a palus (an early relative of the later wooden pell). This training would have provided the Roman soldier with a good foundation of skill, to be improved upon from practical experience or further advanced training.

=== Post-classical history ===
Little is known about early medieval fencing techniques save for what may be concluded from archaeological evidence and artistic depiction (see Viking Age arms and armour). What little has been found, however, shows the use of the sword was limited during the Viking age, especially among the Vikings themselves and other northern Germanic tribes. Here, the spear, axe, and shield were prominent weapons, with only wealthy individuals owning swords. These weapons, based on the early Germanic spatha, were made very well. The technique of pattern welding of composite metals, invented in the Roman Empire around the end of the 2nd century A.D., provided some of these northern weapons superior properties in strength and resilience to the iron gladius of early Rome.

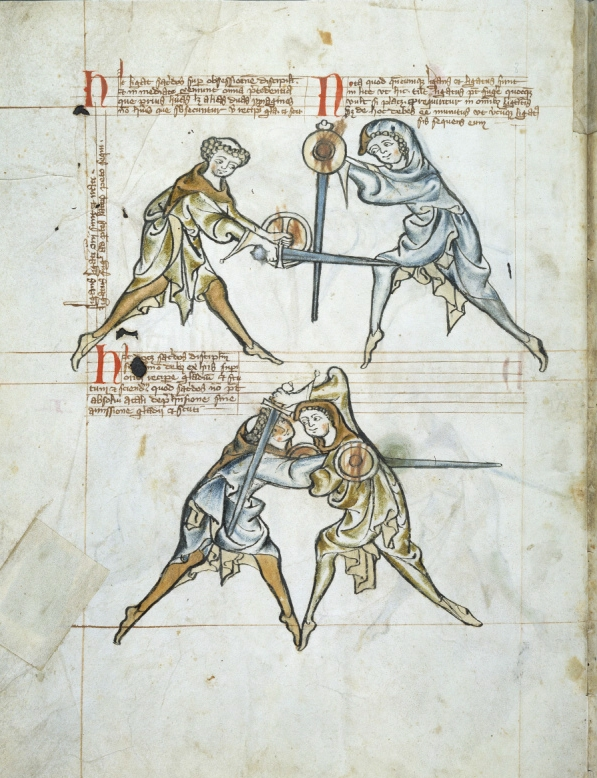
The MS I.33 manuscript, dated to ca. 1290, shows fencing with the arming sword and the buckler.

As time passed, the spatha evolved into the arming sword, a weapon with a notable cruciform hilt common among knights in the Medieval Age. Some time after this evolution, the earliest known treatises (Fechtbücher) were written, dealing primarily with arming sword and buckler combat. Among these examples is the I.33, the earliest known Fechtbuch. The German school of swordsmanship can trace itself most closely to Johannes Liechtenauer and his students, who later became the German masters of the 15th century, including Sigmund Ringeck, Hans Talhoffer, Peter von Danzig and Paulus Kal. It is possible that the Italian fencing treatise Flos Duellatorum, written by the Italian swordmaster Fiore dei Liberi around 1410, has ties to the German school. During this period of time, the longsword grew out of the arming sword, eventually resulting in a blade comfortably wielded in both hands at once. Armour technology also evolved, leading to the advent of plate armour, and thus swordsmanship was further pressed to meet the demands of killing a very well protected enemy.

For much of the early medieval period, the sword continued to remain a symbol of status. During later years, production techniques became more efficient, and so, while the sword remained a privilege, it was not so heavily confined to only the richest individuals, but rather to the richest classes.

=== Modern history ===
The military importance of swordsmanship rapidly diminished in the 16th century with the advent of firearms. The last prominent battlefield sword to be used was the backsword. Although it was not a new invention, it managed to outlast other forms of war swords, being used by cavalry units and officers.

The power, accuracy, and reliability of firearms continued to improve, however, and soon swords had little place on the battlefield aside from ceremonial purposes. The preferred civilian dueling weapon shifted from the rapier to the faster but shorter smallsword, and eventually shifted totally away from swords to the pistol, following developments in firearm technology. The civilian affair of dueling was banned in most areas, but persisted to some degree regardless of law, until well into the 20th century.

==== Renaissance ====
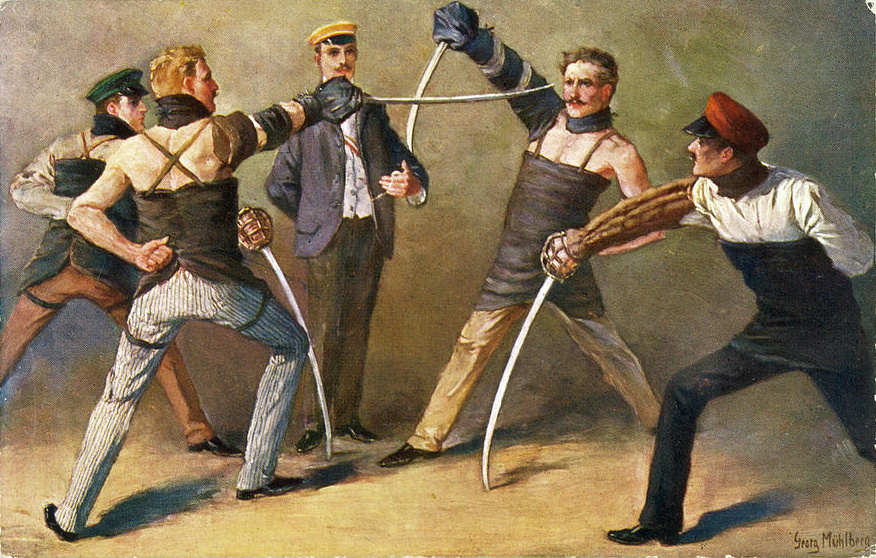
Sabre duel of German students, around 1900, painting by Georg Mühlberg (1863–1925)

The German school of swordsmanship, in general, faced a decline during the Renaissance as the Italian and Spanish schools, which tilted more toward the rapier and civilian dueling, took the forefront. The compendium compiled by Paulus Hector Mair in the 1540s looks back to the preceding century of work and attempts to reconstruct and preserve a failing art. The treatise by Joachim Meyer, dating to the 1570s and notable for its scientific and complete approach to the style (it is suggested that Meyer's students came to him with less military knowledge and therefore required more basic instruction), is the last major account of the German school, and its context is now almost entirely sportive.

The use of the longsword continued to decline throughout the Renaissance period, marked by the increased effectiveness of the arquebus and the use of pike squares as a powerful implement of battle. During this time, civilian swords evolved to side-swords, also known as "cut and thrust" swords, and progressed towards the thicker, tapering sword that eventually became the 17th century rapier. This new weapon was popular for both protection on the street and as a tool in the duel, but found little success on the battlefield. The Italian, French, and Spanish schools embraced this change in civilian armament and developed systems of rapier fencing. The German school, however, provides little on this weapon and ceases its prevalence thereafter.

==== Development into a sport ====
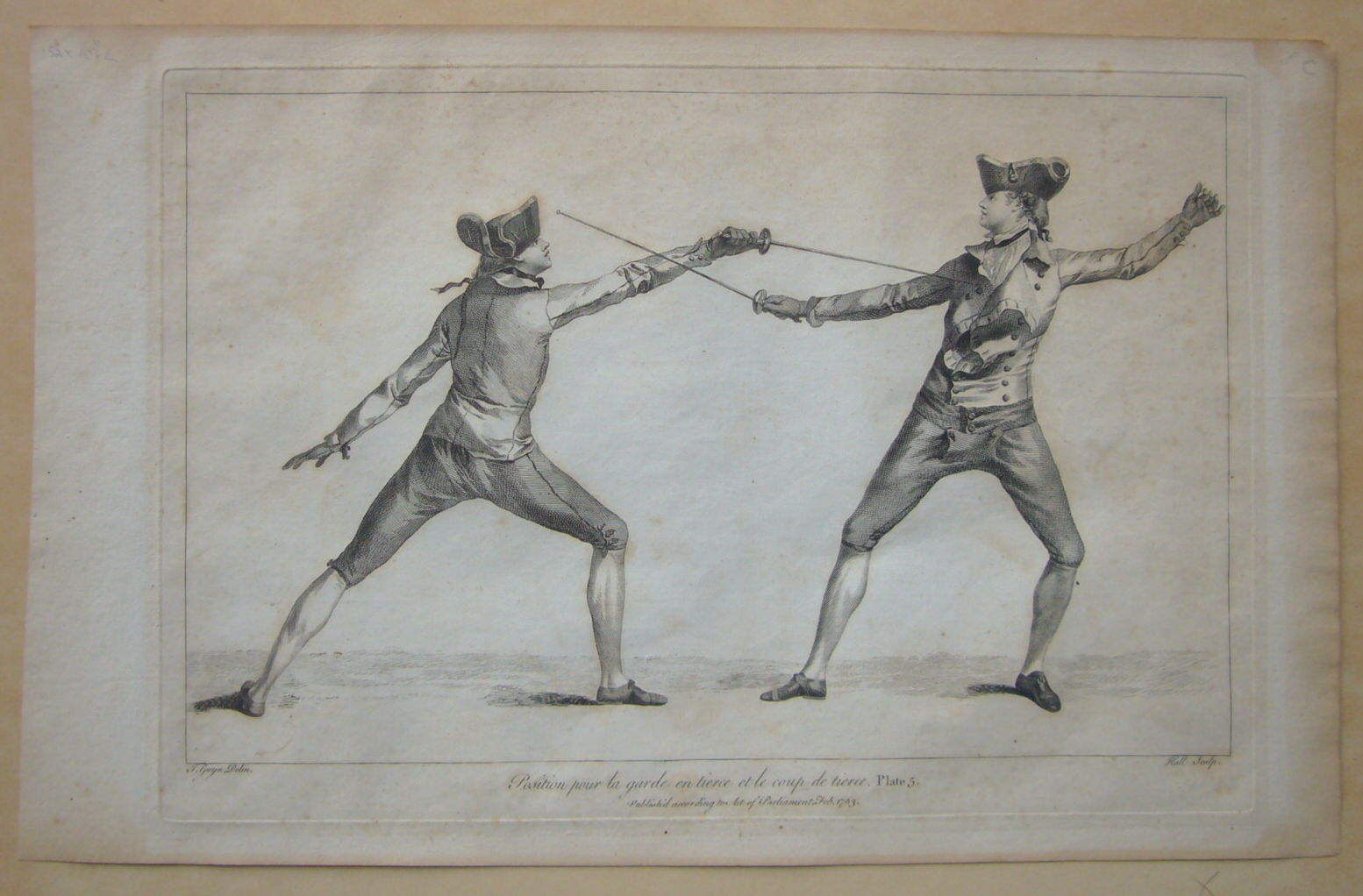
1763 fencing print from Domenico Angelo's instruction book. Angelo was instrumental in turning fencing into an athletic sport.

The need to train swordsmen for combat in a nonlethal manner led fencing and swordsmanship to include a sport aspect from its beginnings, from before the medieval tournament right up to the modern age.

The shift towards fencing as a sport rather than as military training happened from the mid-18th century, and was led by Domenico Angelo, who established a fencing academy, Angelo's School of Arms, in Carlisle House, Soho, London in 1763. There, he taught the aristocracy the fashionable art of swordsmanship which they had previously had to go the continent to learn, and also set up a riding school in the former rear garden of the house. He was fencing instructor to the Royal Family. With the help of artist Gwyn Delin, he had an instruction book published in England in 1763, which had 25 engraved plates demonstrating classic positions from the old schools of fencing. His school was run by three generations of his family and dominated the art of European fencing for almost a century.

He established the essential rules of posture and footwork that still govern modern sport fencing, although his attacking and parrying methods were still much different from current practice. Although he intended to prepare his students for real combat, he was the first fencing master yet to emphasize the health and sporting benefits of fencing more than its use as a killing art, particularly in his influential book L'École des armes (The School of Fencing), published in 1763. According to the Encyclopædia Britannica, "Angelo was the first to emphasize fencing as a means of developing health, poise, and grace. As a result of his insight and influence, fencing changed from an art of war to a sport."

As fencing progressed, the combat aspect slowly faded until only the rules of the sport remained. While fencing taught in the late 19th and early 20th centuries was intended to serve both for competition and the duel (while understanding the differences between the two situations), the type of fencing taught in a modern sport fencing salle is intended only to train the student to compete in the most effective manner within the rules of the sport.

As this evolution has continued, the training and techniques have become increasingly further removed from their martial roots.

===== Historical fencing =====
Advertisement for Alfred Hutton's swordsmanship show at the Bath Club.

As early as 1880, attempts were made to recreate the older German, Italian, and Spanish schools of swordsmanship. The movement was led in England by the soldier, writer, antiquarian, and swordsman, Alfred Hutton. In 1862, he organized in his regiment stationed in India the Cameron Fencing Club, for which he prepared his first work, a 12-page booklet entitled Swordsmanship.

After returning from India in 1865, Hutton focused on the study and revival of older fencing systems and schools. He began tutoring groups of students in the art of 'ancient swordplay' at a club attached to the London Rifle Brigade School of Arms in the 1880s. In 1889, Hutton published his most influential work Cold Steel: A Practical Treatise on the Sabre, which presented the historical method of military sabre use on foot, combining the 18th century English backsword with modern Italian duelling sabre.

Hutton's pioneering advocacy and practice of historical fencing included reconstructions of the fencing systems of several historical masters including George Silver and Achille Marozzo. He delivered numerous practical demonstrations with his colleague Egerton Castle of these systems during the 1890s, both in order to benefit various military charities and to encourage patronage of the contemporary methods of competitive fencing. Exhibitions were held at the Bath Club and a fund-raising event was arranged at Guy's Hospital.

Despite this revival, the practice died out soon after the death of Hutton in 1910. Interest in the physical application of historical fencing techniques remained largely dormant during the first half of the 20th century, and only revived near the end of the 20th century.

===== Classical fencing =====
Practitioners of modern fencing, who were unsatisfied with the exclusive sports emphasis that modern fencing had, took steps to preserve the principles of dueling and fencing as practiced in the 19th and early 20th centuries. Classical fencing uses the foil, épée, and sabre according to these older practices.

Fencing and sword fighting have been incorporated into films as part of cinematic action sequences. Usually choreographed, these scenes are designed for entertainment but often demonstrate a high level of skill. Actor Errol Flynn became known for his sword-fighting scenes, such as in The Adventures of Robin Hood (1938). Other examples include The Princess Bride (1987), Rob Roy (1995), and Die Another Day (2002).

== Africa ==
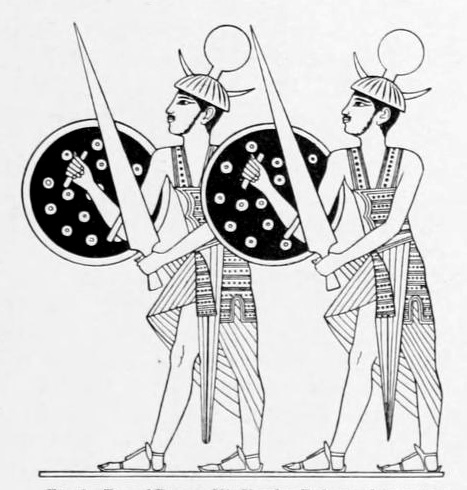
Sherden guards with double-edge swords

=== North Africa ===
The sword in ancient Egypt was known by several names, but most are variations of the words sfet, seft or nakhtui. The earliest bronze swords in the country date back 4000 years. Four types of sword are known to have been used: the ma or boomerang-sword based on the hunting stick, the kat or knife-sword, the khopesh or falchion based on the sickle, and a fourth form of straight longsword. The khopesh was used region-wide and is depicted as early as the Sixth Dynasty (3000 BC). It was thick-backed and weighted with bronze, sometimes even with gold hilts in the case of pharaohs. The blade may be edged on one or both sides, and was made from copper alloy, bronze, iron, or blue steel. The double-edge grip-tongue sword is believed to have been introduced by the Sherden and became widely dispersed throughout the Near East. These swords are of various lengths, and were paired with shields. They had a leaf-shaped blade, and a handle which hollows away at the centre and thickens at each end. Middle Eastern swords became dominant throughout North Africa after the introduction of Islam, after which point swordsmanship in the region becomes that of Arabian or Middle Eastern fencing.

=== Sub-Saharan Africa ===
Among some communities, swords were restricted to royalty or tribal leaders. Forms vary from one area to another, such as the billao of Somalia, boomerang-sword in Niger or the single-edge swords of the Gold Coast. The Abyssinian shotel took the form of a large sickle, like the Egyptian khopesh, with a small 10 cm (3.9 in) wooden handle. The edge was on the inside of the blade, which has a mid-rib running along its entire length. Double-edge swords similar to those of Europe and ancient Arabia occurred in some areas such as the takoba and kaskara. Two types of sword existed in Zanzibar: the 30 cm (12 in) shortsword and the standard sword with a blade measuring 76–90 cm (30–35 in) had a cylindrical pommel. The latter weapon was wielded with both hands like a quarterstaff.

== Asia ==
=== East Asia ===
==== Chinese ====
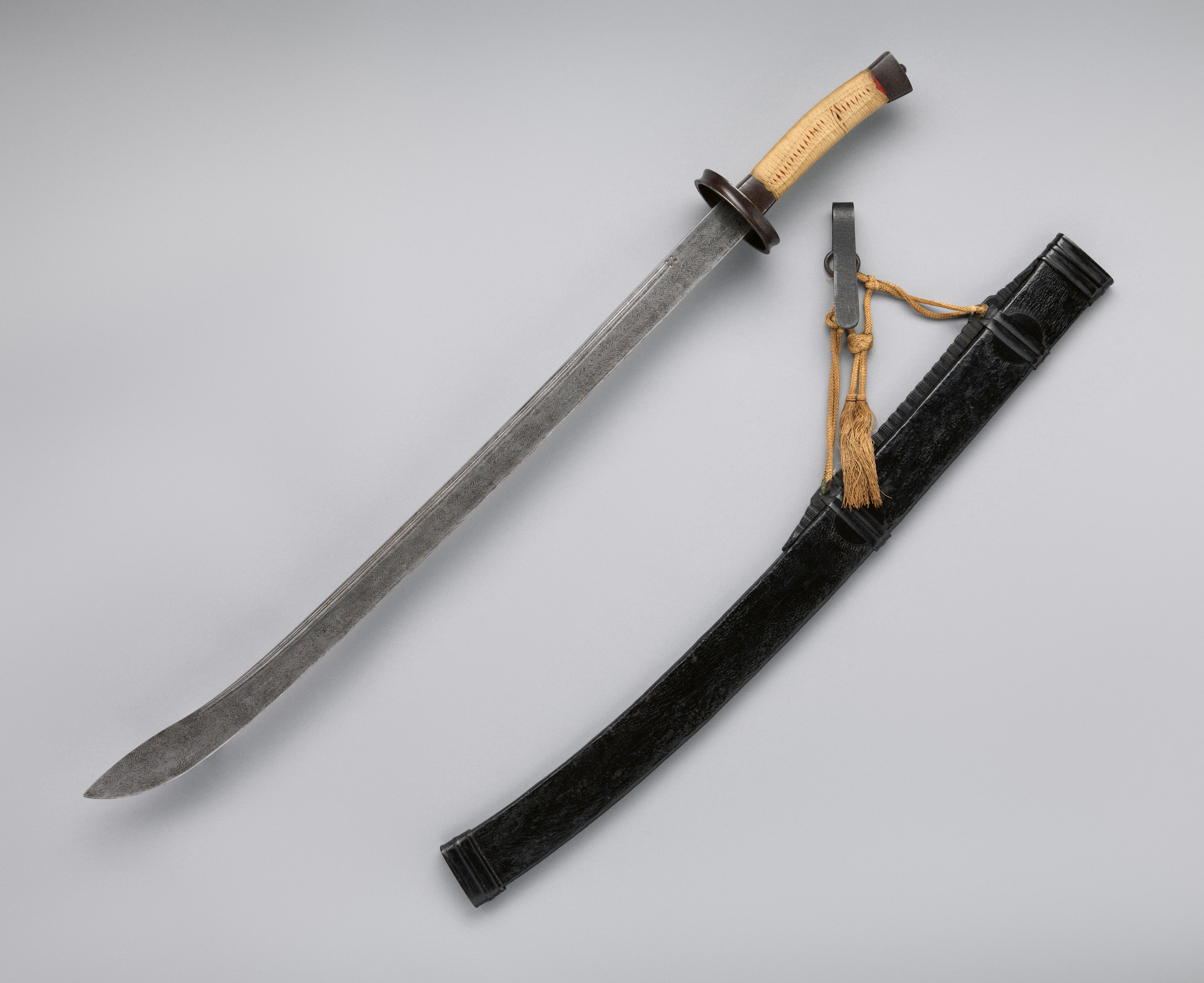
A Chinese dao and scabbard of the 18th century

Chinese speakers make a clear distinction between a "sword" (double-edged) and a "knife" (single-edged). In Chinese culture the double-edged sword or jian is considered a master's weapon or gentlemen's weapon, both from the considerable skill required to fight with this weapon and from the fact that commanders of armies favored the jian in order to move easily amongst the troops. It is described in Chinese as the "delicate lady" of weapons, and is traditionally considered the weapon most suitable for women. A single edged sword is referred to as a dao. The jian and dao are among the four main weapons taught in the Chinese system, the others being the staff and spear. The order in which these weapons is taught may vary between schools and styles, but the jian is generally taught last among the four.

==== Japanese ====
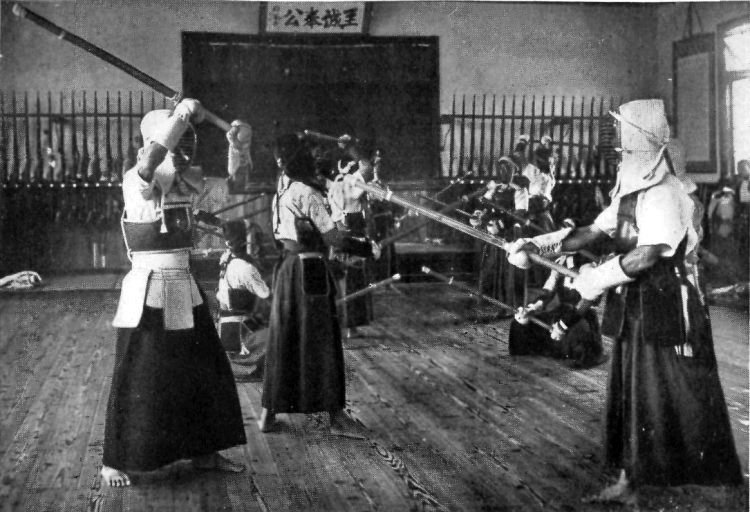
Kendo at an agricultural school in Japan around 1920

The sword has long held a significance in Japanese culture from the reverence and care that the samurai placed in their weapons. The earliest swords in Japan were straight, based on early Hwandudaedo from Korean peninsula. Curved blades became more common at the end of the 8th century, with the importation of the curved forging techniques of that time. The shape was more efficient when fighting from horseback. Japanese swordsmanship is primarily two-handed wherein the front hand pushes down and the back hand pulls up while delivering a basic vertical cut. The samurai often carried two swords, the longer katana and the shorter wakizashi, and these were normally wielded individually, though use of both as a pair did occur.

While earlier tachi were primarily intended to be used from horseback and were thus worn with the edge facing down, the later katana was worn with the edge facing upwards; this simple alteration allowed the wielder to transition immediately from a draw directly into an attack without needing to first re-orient their weapon or body, proving to be a more efficient and practical optimization tailored toward melee combat scenarios (which were becoming more common than mounted combat at that time).During the feudal period, especially in the Edo era, the techniques of the Japanese sword were taught in dōjō as Kenjutsu and Iaijutsu.

After World War II, these traditions came to be introduced internationally as “Japanese swordsmanship,” and today they are represented by various disciplines such as Kendo, Kenjutsu, Shinkendo, and Iaido, each with distinct methods of instruction and practice.

Kendo has developed into a competitive sport, using bamboo swords (shinai) and protective armor, where points are scored through striking techniques, and thus differs significantly from the practical use of a real sword.

Kenjutsu, on the other hand, survives primarily as classical traditions (koryū), emphasizing pre-arranged forms (kata) practiced in paired settings, although in modern times some newly founded schools also identify themselves as kenjutsu.

In contrast, Shinkendo is a comprehensive martial art that integrates the elements of kenjutsu, iaijutsu, and test cutting (tameshigiri) into a unified system. It emphasizes the use of a real blade and seeks to preserve the practical principles of cutting, including proper edge alignment, distancing, and body mechanics, rather than isolating techniques into separate disciplines.

Iaido, derived from iaijutsu, focuses in its modern form on the solo practice of drawing, cutting, and resheathing the sword, often beginning from a seated position, with an emphasis on precision, control, and form.

==== Korean ====
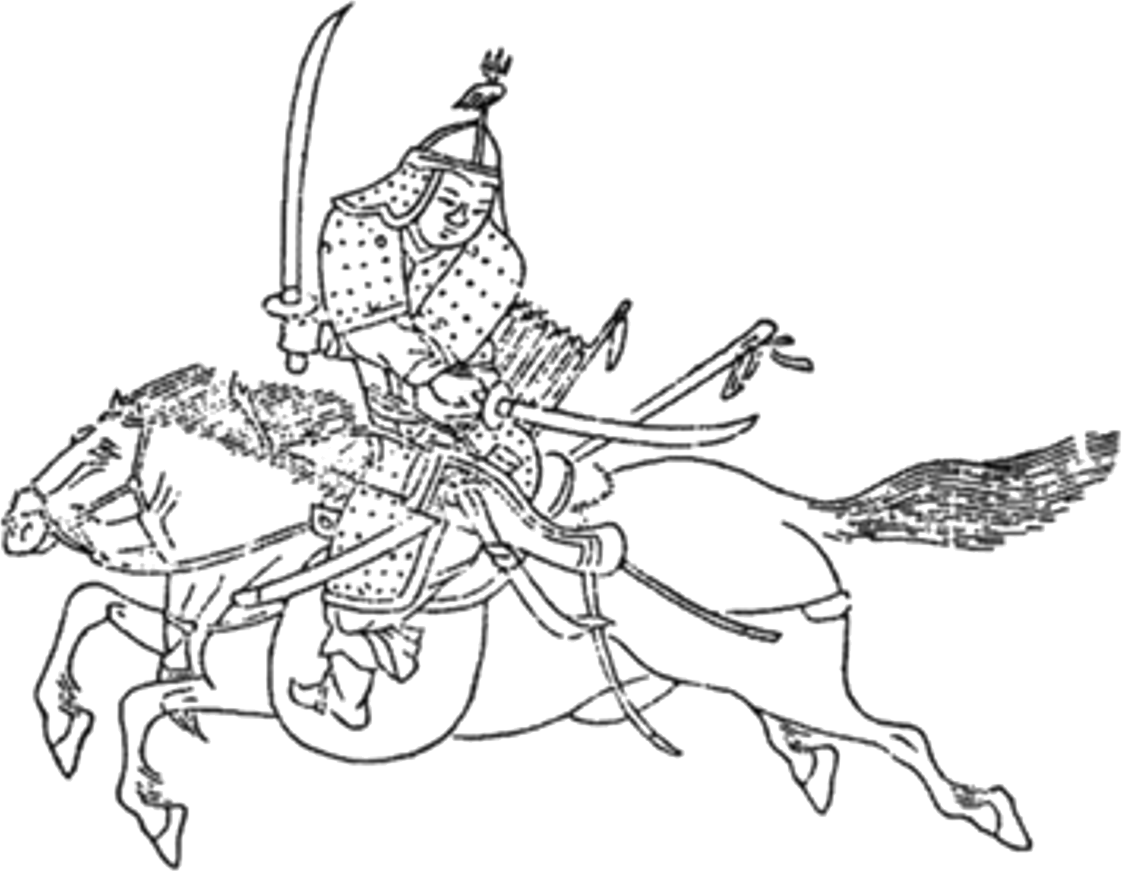
An excerpt from the Muyedobotongji: mounted double-sword (마상쌍검; 馬上雙劍)

The earliest Korean swords were Hwandudaedo, consisting of double and single blade with pommel ring at the end. This sword was spread to other nearby countries from Baekje. As Korean warfare favoured mounted combat, the curved single-edge sword was found to be more effective from horseback. Joseon's centralized government and the need to fend off frequent foreign invasions were conducive to the development of swordsmanship as a standardized military discipline. Along with other martial systems, forms of swordsmanship were formalised in the military manual Muyejebo (1610) based on Qi Jiguang's Ji Xiao Xin Shu, and in the revisions, Muyesinbo (1759) and Muyedobotongji (1790). The Muyedobotongji also describes standard lengths and weights of the swords used; while not exclusive to swordsmanship, 8 of the 23 chapters are devoted to it, reflecting the needs of the era when guns had not yet matured enough for short-range combat. Kumdo was created with influence mainly from Japanese Kendo while minor influence came from Muyedobotongji.

=== Southeast Asia ===
==== Filipino ====
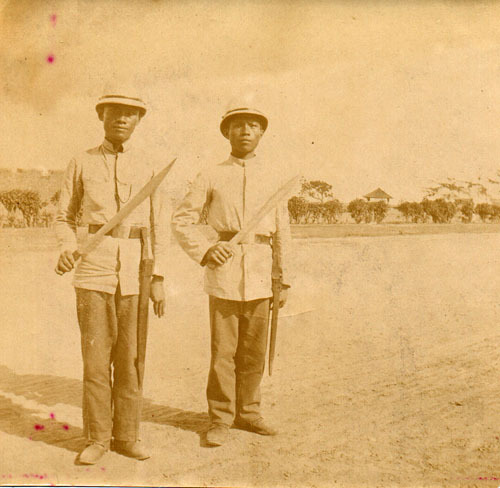
Filipino soldiers armed with bolos

Swords in the Philippines come in a variety of forms but are traditionally consistent with the straight or lightly curved cutting type used by the tribes of neighbouring Borneo and Taiwan. This is preserved in the design of the kampilan and the dahong palay, though other forms also existed. They were typically paired with a rectangular shield called the kalasag. During the Battle of Mactan, Lapu-Lapu's tribe used native swords and spears to defeat Ferdinand Magellan's troops who were armed with guns and cannons.

The arrival of European colonists brought the influence of western swords, which is likely the origin of the pinuti's hand-guard and sabre-like blade. When the Philippines was colonized by the Spaniards, the use of traditional swords and weapons was immediately banned. Because of this, the Filipinos were forced to use their own farm tools to fight in rebellions. And in the following insurgencies against other foreign colonists like America and Japan, they were again forced to use these improvised weapons. During the Japanese occupation, because of scarce ammunition to fight the Japanese, the Filipinos used guerrilla attacks with their melee weapons and swords in raiding Japanese camps. Filipino swordplay relies heavily on speed, and even today Filipino marines train in a form of eskrima using a curved single-edge sword.

=== South Asia ===
==== Indian ====
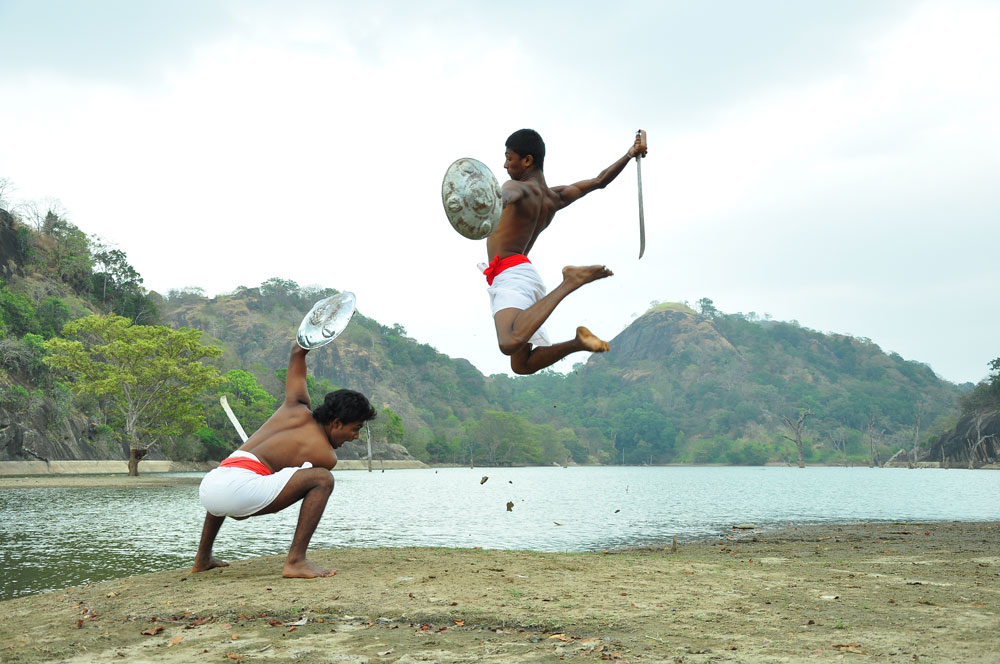
Angampora exponents with swords and bucklers.

Soldiers in ancient Indian subcontinent are recorded as carrying a shield and spear in their hands while a sword, dagger, and battle-axe were held at the waist. These included both straight swords and slightly curved sabres. The stout, straight sword appears to have been common and can be seen in early sculptural depictions of the epics. The hero Arjuna, for instance, is made to wield a one-handed sword with a bevelled point, a small handguard, and a large round pommel. Two-handed swords naturally had longer handles and were broad at the hilt. Curved swords are also known to have been in common use since at least the Buddhist era, including large kukri-like falchions. The most common type of curved sword is the katti, which still occurs under various names everywhere from the deep south to the far northeast. The handle, in particular, has changed over time, eventually incorporating a crossguard. The 16th-century Mughal conquests spread the talwar and similar weapons throughout the north, northwest and central regions. The talwar is still the most common form of sword in the martial arts of these areas, but the older katti is still used in some advanced forms.

The earliest extant manual on ancient Indian swordsmanship is the Agni Purana, which gives 32 positions to be taken with the sword and shield. Indian swordplay is highly athletic, taking advantage of the weapon's lightweight. Techniques make extensive use of circular movements, often circling the weapon around the swordsman's head. Systems exist which focus on drawing the sword out of the opponent's body. The attacking weapon is rarely used for blocking, relying either on a shield as a parrying tool or a second sword. Dual-wielding is thus a common and valued skill in the Indian subcontinent. Sparring is done through an exercise called gatka, in which the practitioners fight with wooden sticks to simulate swords.

== Middle East ==
=== Persian and Hebrew ===
Swords in the Middle East evolved from daggers and sickles. They were originally made of copper, followed by bronze and finally iron. Among communities such as the Persians and Hebrews, the sword was short and equivalent to the Roman gladius. There did however exist longswords, slightly curved swords, and sickle-like swords similar to the Egyptian khopesh. Some blades were of such varying sizes that it is difficult to classify them as either daggers or swords, and they are thus referred to by archaeologists as dagger-swords.In modern Iran, traditional Persian armed combat called razmafzar is currently being reconstructed. At present, sword training includes the single sword, two swords, and the sword with a shield.

=== Assyrian and Hittite ===
Among the Assyrians and Hittites, the sword or namsaru was long with a slender blade. In the ancient Middle East, swords were always a secondary weapon. Assyrians made extensive use of the sword and dagger in hand-to-hand combat; the primary weapons were the bow, spear, and sling.

=== Arabia and the Levant ===
Prior to the founding of Islam, swords were imported from Ubulla, a town along the Tigris river in Iraq.

Arabian swords retained their straight double-edge shape during the time of Muhammed. With the exception of their curved handles, they were nearly identical to medieval European arming swords in both function and design. They typically had a cruciform hilt and favoured cut and thrust techniques. Swords of this type were often paired with a shield or buckler but could also be wielded on their own, Ali ibn Abi Talib used a distinguished double bladed sword called Zulfiqar .

Sword fencing and sword dances are still practiced in much of the Middle East. In countries like Oman the weapon is typically paired with a shield or sometimes a dagger, of which many varieties exist. The spread of Islam was a unifying force in the Middle East, easing trade routes across the region. Armouries flourished and Damascus became the capital for trade in swords from Syria, Persia and Spain. The 9th-century Muslim scholar Al-Kindi studied the craft of forging swords and found 25 sword-making techniques particular to their countries of origin, including Yemen, Iran, France, and Russia.

=== Ottoman ===
The curved scimitar blade which has now come to typify Middle Eastern swords came about after the Turkish Seljuk migration from Central Asia to Anatolia, popularizing the pre-existing Byzantine sabre designs for cavalry use, which influenced the entire region. The curved blade was well-suited to the equestrian culture of the Turks. The scimitar gave primacy to hacking and slashing techniques rather than thrusting.

== See also ==
- Dual wield
- Sword
- Types of swords
- Armored combat (sport)
