= Chivalry Bookshelf =

American publisher

Chivalry Bookshelf was a small press based in the United States founded by Brian R. Price which published booklets and books from 1992 to 2007. It was most notable for its contributions to the Society of Creative Anachronism and the early historical fencing movement and for a dispute about plagiarism and nonpayment of royalties in 2011–12.

== Notable publications ==
Early Chivalry Bookshelf publications were mostly written or edited by Price and focused on European knightly culture and the SCA. These included Chronique, the Journal of Chivalry and The Book of the Tournament as well as modernized English translations of Ramon Lull's Book of Knighthood & Chivalry and the Ordène de Chevalerie and a reprint of Bengt Thordeman's 1939–1940 two-volume Armour from the Battle of Wisby, 1361 (2001).

From 2001 to 2007, the Chivalry Bookshelf published nineteen books by other authors involved in the growing Western Martial Arts movement.

- Secrets of German Medieval Swordsmanship: Sigmund Ringeck's Commentaries on Johannes Liechtenauer's Verse, translated and interpreted by Christian Henry Tobler (2001)
- The Arte of Defence: an introduction to the use of the rapier, by William E. Wilson
- De Arte Gladiatoria Dimicandi: 15th century swordsmanship of Master Filippo Vadi, translated by Luca Porzio with a commentary by Gregory Mele
- Jousts and Tournaments: Charny and the Rules for Chivalric Sport in Fourteenth-Century France, translated and with a commentary by Dr. Steven Muhlberger
- SPADA: An Anthology of Swordsmanship in Memory of Ewart Oakeshott, edited by Stephen Hand
- The Medieval Art of Swordsmanship: a facsimile & translation of Europe's oldest personal combat treatise, Royal Armouries Ms. I.33, by Dr. Jeffrey L. Forgeng
- Medieval Sword & Shield: the Combat System of Royal Armouries MS I.33, by Stephen Hand and Paul Wagner
- Fighting with the German Longsword, by Christian Henry Tobler
- The Swordsman's Companion, by Guy Windsor
- The Art of Dueling: 17th Century Rapier Combat as Taught by Salvator Fabris, by Salvator Fabris, translated by Tomasso Leoni
- SPADA 2: An Anthology of Swordsmanship, edited by Stephen Hand
- Teaching and Interpreting Historical Swordsmanship, an anthology edited by Price, to which he also contributed three of its seventeen articles: "The One True Way," "Seven-iron, Please!" and "In a Few Pages: Fighting between the Poste of Fiore dei Liberi"
- Deeds of Arms: Formal Combats in the Late Fourteenth Century, by Dr. Steven Muhlberger
- The Royal Book of Jousting, Horsemanship, and Knightly Combat: a Translation into English of King Dom Duarte's 1438 Treatise Livro da Ensinança de Bem cavalgar Toda Sela (The Art of Riding in Every Saddle), translated by Antonio Franco Preto and edited by Dr. Steven Muhlberger.
- The Duellist's Companion: a Training Manual for 17th Century Italian Rapier, by Guy Windsor
- English Swordsmanship: the True Fight of George Silver. Vol. 1, Single Sword, by Stephen Hand
- Fighting with the Quarterstaff: a Modern Study of Renaissance Technique, by David Lindholm
- Academy of the Sword: wherein is demonstrated by mathematical rules on the foundation of a mysterious circle the theory and practice of the true and heretofore unknown secrets of handling arms on foot and horseback (1628), by Gerard Thibault d'Anvers, translated by John Michael Greer
- In Service of the Duke: the 15th Century Fighting Treatise of Paulus Kal, translated by Christian Henry Tobler

In 2007, Price published Fiore dei Liberi's Sword in two hands: a full-color training guide for Medieval longsword based on Fiore dei Liberi's Fior di Battaglia, which is also the most recent book published by The Chivalry Bookshelf.

== Controversies ==
In 2009, Dr. Yuri Cowan, a postdoctoral Research Fellow concentrating on "nineteenth-century poetry, historiography, medievalism, and the history of the book" at Ghent University, Belgium, and a member of the William Morris Society, edited the Kelmscott edition of The Ordination of Knighthood for the "Morris Online Edition," a web-based scholarly edition of the works of William Morris published at the University of Iowa Libraries website.

In the Headnote: Introduction, Cowan accused Price of plagiarizing William Morris's translation of the Ordene de chevalerie in Price's 2001 The Chivalry Bookshelf edition:

Whereas the cover of the book and the title page both name the book as "Ramon Lull's Book of Knighthood and Chivalry & the Anonymous Ordene de Chevalerie" without reference to any translators, and the endicia lists "Ramon Lull's Book of Knighthood and Chivalry/Translated by William Caxton/Rendered into modern English by Brian R. Price", the back of the hardcover dustjacket includes a paragraph crediting Morris as the translator of the Ordene de Chevalerie.

But perhaps the most striking instance of the afterlife of this volume is a little book published by The Chivalry Bookshelf in 2001, entitled Ramon Lull's Book of Knighthood and Chivalry and the anonymous Ordene [sic] de Chevalerie ("translated by William Caxton / Rendered into modern English by Brian R. Price"). This book is avowedly a work of enthusiasm by Price, who writes in his introduction that "with the growing convergence between students of chivalric lore, reenactors, Western martial artists, and medievalists – the time seems right to release this new version. I hope it brings much pleasurable contemplation and provokes thought along [sic] what it meant – and what it means – to be a knight" (iii). There is no reason why Price should have included both works together, except that William Morris had once done so in his Kelmscott edition of 1892–3. In fact, a close look at Price's edition reveals that he has stolen Morris' translation verbatim for the entire text of the Ordène, and gives Morris no credit whatsoever. Indeed, he does not mention Morris even once throughout his entire introduction, nor anywhere in the book [5]. Although Morris' work is certainly in the public domain, Price's appropriation of it without attribution is a decidedly unchivalrous piece of plagiarism. And yet this lately pirated edition, too, is an example of the long reach of Morris' influence in unexpected places – as a translator, as a medievalist, and as a shaper of the canon.

[5] In his introduction, Price repeatedly emphasises the "anonymity" of the Ordène. It is possible that, owing to Morris's rather medieval humility in not appending his own authorial name to the translation of the Ordène, Price understood the translation of the Ordène in the Kelmscott volume to be Caxton's – suggesting at least that Morris's medievalising idiom was convincing!

No mention is made of Morris's work on the Lull text, however, and the paperback edition does not mention Morris at all. Further, the two were included together in this enthusiast's volume because they are discussed together in the first chapter of Maurice Keen's foundational work, Chivalry (Yale University Press, 1984), a work that provided the underpinning for many of Price's early works.

In early 2011, seven authors who had published with Chivalry Bookshelf (Dr. Jeffrey Forgeng, Guy Windsor, Dr. Steven Muhlberger, Christian Tobler, Luca Porzio, Gregory Mele and Tom Leoni) stated that royalty payments had been withheld since 2006, editorial fees had not been paid, verbal agreements had not been honoured, Tobler had not been paid his portion of foreign language rights-sales on one of his title, and that a Chivalry Bookshelf affiliated editor and co-author had been over-paid in the production of the Filippo Vadi treatise discussed above. The dispute was settled out of court, with Chivalry Bookshelf releasing all remaining product and copyright to the individual authors.

In February, 2011, Price announced that "there will be no further Bookshelf titles except for my own, and there are only three of these planned, if they ever come out." As of 2023, no books have appeared under the Chivalry Bookshelf imprint since then.
