= Martin Hundfeld =

German fencer

Martin Hundfeld (also Huntzfeld, possibly from Hundsfeld, a village some 20 km east of Würzburg) was an early 15th-century (died before 1452) German fencing master. His teaching is recorded by Peter von Danzig in Cod. 44 A 8 and by Hans von Speyer in M I 29. Hundfeld is numbered among the "society of Liechtenauer" by Paulus Kal.
