= Brian R. Price =

Brian R. Price is an American university professor, historical fencing instructor, and member of the Society for Creative Anachronism. He taught at Hawai'i Pacific University, (where he offered courses in the history of warfare, in counterinsurgency, and in strategy at the graduate and undergraduate levels) until some time before Nov. 11, 2022, when he was not listed among the faculty there. As of Nov. 10, 2022, Price is listed as "an Associate Professor in the Department of Joint Warfighting at the Air Command and Staff College", Air University at Maxwell AFB in Alabama

Until his graduation from the University of North Texas and deployment to Afghanistan as part of the Human Terrain System in 2011-2012, Price was best known in the worlds of historical reenactment, medieval history, and the SCA. He manufactured replica armour and wrote the book Techniques of Medieval Armour Reproduction. Price founded the Chivalry Bookshelf in 1992 to publish Chronique, the Journal of Chivalry, but eventually began publishing books about Western Martial Arts, arms and armor, and the subject of chivalry. The press produced twenty-six titles between 2001 and 2007 until a dispute with the authors over royalties. He and his wife Ann also jointly ran Revival Enterprises during the same period, which developed a line of leather and sundries for re-enactment and Western Martial Arts practitioners until they "transitioned the business in 2011 to a silent partnership."

Price co-founded the American Company of Saint George, a medieval-styled "tournament society" that, together with Chronique: The Journal of Chivalry, helped to inspire many other similar tournament societies throughout North America, in Europe and in Australia. Price is a co-founder and, until a controversy in February 2011, was the president of the Schola Saint George school of Historical European martial arts.

Since the controversies and overseas deployment in 2011-2012, Price's academic and public profile switched focus from chivalric culture to contemporary military affairs, counterinsurgency theory, and similar matters.

== Background ==
From 1984 to 1990 Price manufactured replica armour through a business called Thornbird Arms until he graduated from the University of California, Los Angeles with a B.A. in Political Science in 1990. During his time in the Society for Creative Anachronism he founded two other small businesses: his small press Chivalry Bookshelf (which published new books from 2001 to 2007) and his importer of replica clothing, Revival Enterprises (still active). Although Price says that he "transitioned the (Revival Enterprises) business to a silent partnership in 2011 as interests shifted towards academia and sold it outright in January of 2012, once terms had been agreed", the registration for Revival Enterprises' website was renewed with his name and Alabama address as late as April 2021.

Price worked in the computer software, information technology and internet industries from 1993 to 2000. In 2006 Price entered the University of North Texas to pursue a doctorate in history.

In 2011-12 he worked in Afghanistan as a senior socio-cultural advisor for the Human Terrain System, working with NATO, American and Afghan forces. His work there focused on the Afghan National Security Forces (ANSF), their internal dynamics and their relationship to American and NATO forces as related to counterinsurgency theory and practice. He made use of local and oral history techniques and gathered oral histories on ANSF officers and civilians.

After receiving his PhD in May 2011, Price began in 2012 as a visiting professor at Hawai'i Pacific University, teaching primarily within the graduate program for diplomacy and military studies. Although his dissertation was on medieval history, his research came to focus on contemporary military affairs. As noted above, by November 2022 Price was an associate professor in the Department of Joint Warfighting at the Air Command and Staff College in Alabama and was no longer listed with Hawai'i Pacific University.

== Western Martial Arts ==
Until 2011, Price was best known for his involvement in the Society for Creative Anachronism, historical reenactment, and Western Martial Arts.

Beginning about 1981, Price's exposure to the Western Martial Arts developed through his participation in armored full-contact sport combat through the Society for Creative Anachronism (SCA) in Southern California, in which he participated under the SCA pseudonym of Brion Thornbird ap Rhys, eventually rising to the rank of King of the Kingdom of Caid in 1988. In 1984, Price founded a small armory, Thornbird Arms, directed at the SCA's market for functional historically accurate armor, which he operated until 1990. In recognition of his expertise in "armouring" and his research into the historical combat system of Fiore dei Liberi, the SCA kingdom of Ansteorra elevated Price to its "Order of the Laurel" in 1986 and, in 1987, he was elevated to the SCA's "Order of the Chivalry" (KSCA) for his skill in SCA Armored Combat by the reigning King and Queen of the Kingdom of Caid. Price was awarded the "Queen's Cypher" and the "Princess's Favor" in 1992 by the Kingdom of the West, the "Queen's Guard – Knight Counselor" in 1998, as well as the "Defender of the West" in 2000. Price is also a warranted Armored Combat Authorizing Marshal "At Large" of the Kingdom of Ansteorra.

In the 1990s, Price was also instrumental in establishing the Company of Saint George, a "Tournament Company" within the SCA dedicated to staging historically accurate tournaments and pas d'armes in an SCA context. In 2000, a part of the Company of Saint George developed into the Schola Saint George school of Western Martial Arts, co-founded by Price and Robert Holland in Union City, California. Price directed the Schola Saint George, expanding it to Texas and other regions of the United States and abroad, until his resignation as president in 2011. Currently the SSG has branches in Dallas, Atlanta, Charleston, Boston, Little Rock, Moscow, Latvia, in the San Francisco Bay Area, and in Honolulu.

Under Price's impetus, the Schola Saint George organized the first annual Schola Saint George Medieval Swordsmanship Symposium in May, 2001. It was one of the first conferences in the United States dedicated to bringing together scholars and practitioners of the Historical European Martial Arts, and the largest of its kind up to that time.

In 2004, Price was inducted into the United States Martial Arts Hall of Fame as a Medieval Weapons Master. He is also a member of the American Teachers Association of the Martial Arts.

Price's writings from this period included The Book of the Tournament, Historical Forms of the Tournament for SCA Combat: History, Resources, Examples, and Arming Yourself in the Style of the 14th Century, were written principally for the Society for Creative Anachronism (sometimes under his SCA pseudonym "Sir Brion Thornbird") and were sometimes published by the SCA as well.

In 1996 or 1997, Price also contributed two articles, "On Chivalric Virtues" and "Winning and Losing," to Facets of Knighthood, an anthology of poetry, stories and articles concerning knighthood and chivalry edited by a fellow SCA member, "Cormac the Traveller" (a/k/a Peter Martin), and published by Outlaw Press.

Price republished and expanded his 1991 monograph, The Book of the Tournament, as a book under his The Chivalry Bookshelf imprint in 1996 and, again, in 2002.

In 1999, as a monograph, and, in 2001, as a book, Price published his "translation into modern English" of Ramon Lull's Book of Knighthood & Chivalry, which became widely used as a textbook. The book was republished again in 2002 as a paperback by The Chivalry Bookshelf and Boydell & Brewer and again in 2004 by The Chivalry Bookshelf and Greenhill Press.

Price's Techniques of Medieval Armour Reproduction, was published by Paladin Press in 2000. This book remains the most popular introduction to the field and has provided a springboard from which a generation of armourers working in the medieval style have emerged.

In 2001, Chivalry Bookshelf reprinted Bengt Thordeman's 1939–1940 two-volume Armour from the Battle of Wisby, 1361 as a single volume, and Secrets of German Medieval Swordsmanship: Sigmund Ringeck's Commentaries on Johannes Liechtenauer's Verse, translated and interpreted by Christian Henry Tobler. From 2001 to 2006, Chivalry Bookshelf published about 20 books by prominent members of the early historical fencing movement including William E. Wilson, Tom Leoni, Stephen Hand, and Guy Windsor until a dispute with the authors about royalties (see Controversies below). As of 2023, the most recent Chivalry Bookshelf publication was Price's Fiore dei Liberi's Sword in two hands: a full-color training guide for Medieval longsword based on Fiore dei Liberi's Fior di Battaglia. In February, 2011, Price announced that "there will be no further Bookshelf titles except for my own, and there are only three of these planned, if they ever come out."

In 2002 Price also contributed an article, "In the Lists: The Arthurian Influence in Modern Tournaments of Chivalry," to an independently published anthology, King Arthur in Popular Culture, edited by Elizabeth S. Sklar and Donald L. Hoffman.

In July 2010, Price published in Knight Templar Magazine, "Isn't Chivalry Dead?", a shortened version of the article he had published earlier in Chronique.

In May, 2011, his dissertation, The Martial Arts of Medieval Europe, was accepted by the University of North Texas Department of History. After this date his writing changed focus.

== Military affairs and academic history ==
From 2012 onward, Price has mainly written for professional military and academic audiences.

Price's peer-reviewed articles include "A Proposed Methodology for the Validation of Historical European Martial Arts" (Journal of Transcultural Medieval Studies, 2015), "The Resonance of History: The influence of Soviet-era mujahidin networks in eastern Afghanistan" (Army Press Online Journal, 2016), "Human Terrain at the Crossroads" (Joint Force Quarterly, 2017) and "Yron & Stele: Chivalric Ethos, Martial Pedagogy, Equipment, and Combat Technique in the Early Fourteenth-Century Middle English Version of Guy of Warwick" (Journal of Medieval Military History, 2018) He contributed ten articles to the Sage Encyclopedia of War: Social Science Perspectives (Sage, 2016), that included "Afghan War," "Counterinsurgency," "Guerrilla War," "Human Terrain System," "Minerva Program," Project Camelot," "Honor," "Wars of Medieval Europe," "Military Culture," and "Multilateral Warfare." At the 2015 International Conference for the Study of Martial Arts, he offered a paper, "Aristotle and the Martial Arts of Medieval Europe: The idea of l'arte, pedagogy, and historical context in the medieval fechtbuchen [sic]."

Publications for a general audience on the middle ages from his second period include two articles for Medieval Warfare Magazine, titled "The Poleaxe and the Changing Face of Warfare" (2015) and "A Fifteenth Century Manual of War: Conrad Kyeser's Bellefortis" (2016). A variety of informal publications are available on his ResearchGate and academia.edu pages.

== Controversies ==
In 2009, Dr. Yuri Cowan, a postdoctoral Research Fellow concentrating on "nineteenth-century poetry, historiography, medievalism, and the history of the book" at Ghent University, Belgium, and a member of the William Morris Society, edited the Kelmscott edition of The Ordination of Knighthood for the "Morris Online Edition," a web-based scholarly edition of the works of William Morris published at the University of Iowa Libraries website.

In the Headnote: Introduction, Cowan accused Price of plagiarizing William Morris's translation of the Ordene de chevalerie in Price's 2001 The Chivalry Bookshelf edition:

But perhaps the most striking instance of the afterlife of this volume is a little book published by The Chivalry Bookshelf in 2001, entitled Ramon Lull’s Book of Knighthood and Chivalry and the anonymous Ordene [sic] de Chevalerie (“translated by William Caxton / Rendered into modern English by Brian R. Price”). This book is avowedly a work of enthusiasm by Price, who writes in his introduction that “with the growing convergence between students of chivalric lore, reenactors, Western martial artists, and medievalists – the time seems right to release this new version. I hope it brings much pleasurable contemplation and provokes thought along [sic] what it meant – and what it means – to be a knight” (iii). There is no reason why Price should have included both works together, except that William Morris had once done so in his Kelmscott edition of 1892–3. In fact, a close look at Price’s edition reveals that he has stolen Morris’ translation verbatim for the entire text of the Ordène, and gives Morris no credit whatsoever. Indeed, he does not mention Morris even once throughout his entire introduction, nor anywhere in the book [5]. Although Morris’ work is certainly in the public domain, Price’s appropriation of it without attribution is a decidedly unchivalrous piece of plagiarism. And yet this lately pirated edition, too, is an example of the long reach of Morris’ influence in unexpected places – as a translator, as a medievalist, and as a shaper of the canon.

[5] In his introduction, Price repeatedly emphasises the “anonymity” of the Ordène. It is possible that, owing to Morris’s rather medieval humility in not appending his own authorial name to the translation of the Ordène, Price understood the translation of the Ordène in the Kelmscott volume to be Caxton’s – suggesting at least that Morris’s medievalising idiom was convincing!

Whereas the cover of the book and the title page both name the book as "Ramon Lull's Book of Knighthood and Chivalry & the Anonymous Ordene de Chevalerie" without reference to any translators, and the endicia lists "Ramon Lull's Book of Knighthood and Chivalry/Translated by William Caxton/Rendered into modern English by Brian R. Price", the back of the hardcover dustjacket includes a paragraph crediting Morris as the translator of the Ordene de Chevalerie.

No mention is made of Morris's work on the Lull text, however, and the paperback edition does not mention Morris at all. Further, the two were included together in this enthusiast's volume because they are discussed together in the first chapter of Maurice Keen's foundational work, Chivalry (Yale University Press, 1984), a work that provided the underpinning for many of Price's early works.

On August 7, 2009, the Secretary of State of Texas forfeited the charter of the Schola Saint George (SSG) due to SSG's failure to pay its state franchise taxes and to revive its forfeited privileges within 120 days of said forfeiture while Price was serving as its registered agent. A copy of the Certificate of Forfeiture was publicly posted on February 22, 2011 during the online exchange between Price and the authors. On February 25, 2011, the new president of Schola Saint George announced that Price had tendered his resignation as president for "personal reasons."

== See also ==
- Historical European Martial Arts
- Western Martial Arts
- Italian school of swordsmanship
