= Ringen =

German language term for grappling (wrestling)

ringen, kampfringen
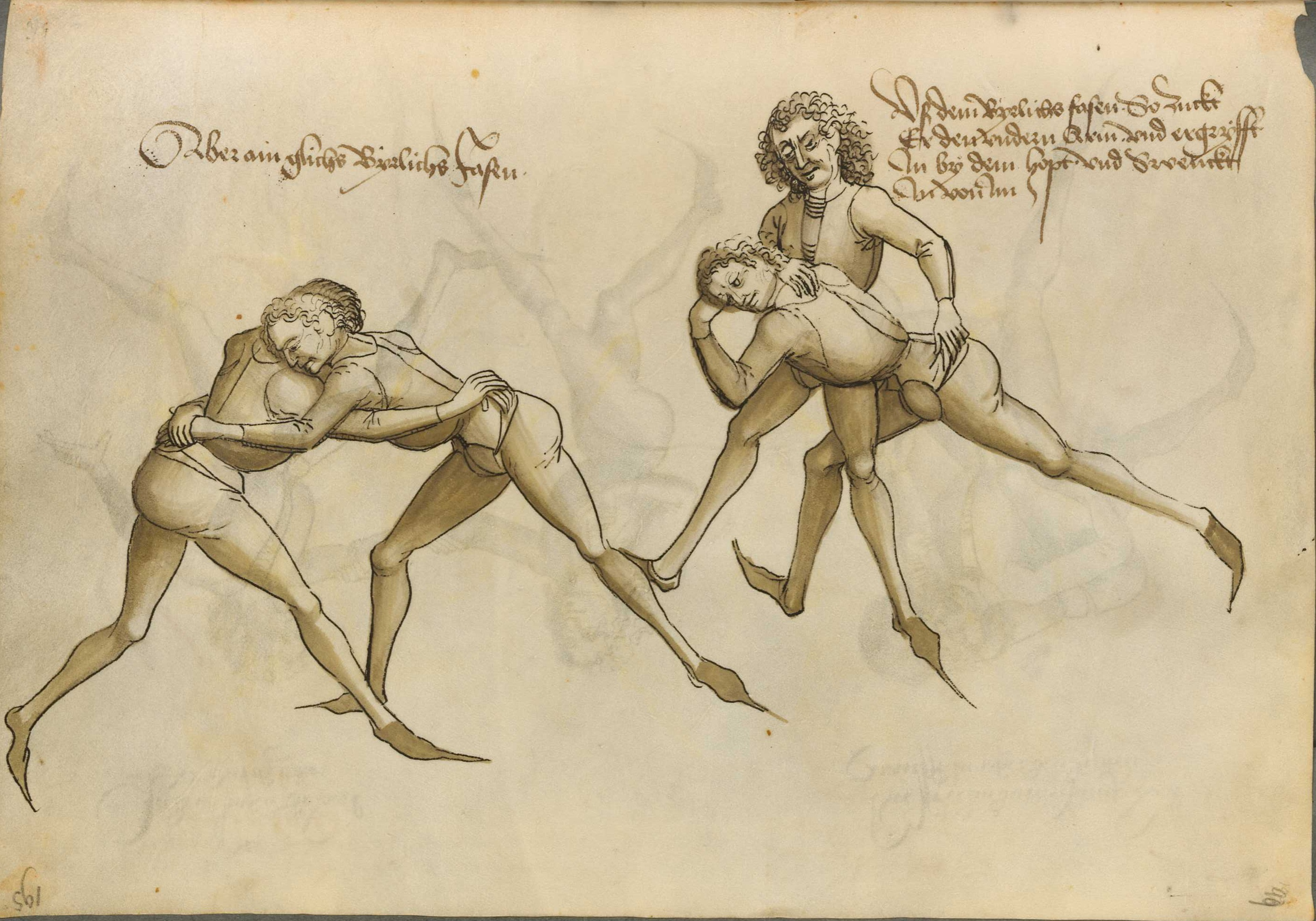
- a throwing technique as illustrated in the 1467 fechtbuch by Hans Talhoffer
- Focus: grappling, wrestling
- Country of origin: Holy Roman Empire
- Famous practitioners: Ott Jud, Paulus Kal
- Descendant arts: (German) Folk wrestling, Schwingen

Ringen is the German language term for grappling (wrestling). In the context of the German school of historical European martial arts during the Late Middle Ages and the German Renaissance, Ringen refers to unarmed combat in general, including grappling techniques used as part of swordsmanship.

The German tradition has records of a number of master-Ringer of the 15th to 16th centuries specializing in unarmed combat, such as Ott Jud.

Medieval and early Renaissance wrestling treatises present both sport and combat techniques together as one art. The distinction is made more frequently by modern practitioners than is present in historical sources, but in a select few examples the terms for sportive grappling or geselliges Ringen and earnest unarmed combat or Kampfringen (where Kampf is the Early Modern German term for "war" or battle) were used to describe specific techniques which were only suitable for one scenario or the other.

There are no known sources describing medieval rulesets for Ringen competition. However, many living folk wrestling styles in Europe are fought until a throw is completed. The lack of detailed ground wrestling in the medieval wrestling treatises supports the theory that in both competition and combat the throw was more important than extended ground wrestling.

While sportive grappling had fixed rules that prohibited dangerous techniques, usually starting in grappling hold and ending with a throw or submission, Kampfringen can be considered a system of unarmed self-defense including punches, joint-locks, knee strikes, chokeholds, headbutts and (to a limited extent) kicks.

The German tradition of Ringen was eclipsed during the 17th century as the modern Baroque understanding of nobility precluded the participation of the higher classes in wrestling matches. Wrestling continued to be practiced among the lower classes, giving rise to the various traditional styles of folk wrestling. The still existing Swiss martial art Schwingen is directly related to Kampfringen.

== History ==
One of the primary men to have shaped Ringen at the dawning of the Renaissance appears to have been Austrian master Ott Jud. Ott was a master of the early 15th century. He is credited in multiple medieval combat treatises with a series of wrestling techniques, including joint breaks, arm locks and throws. No treatise from Ott's own hand has survived, but his system is taught by several fencing masters of the later 15th century, including Hans Talhoffer (1443), Peter von Danzig and Jud Lew. Paulus Kal counts him among the "society of Liechtenauer", saying that he was wrestling teacher to the "lords of Austria" (possibly under Frederick III). According to both Talhoffer and Lew, Ott was a baptized Jew.

Other treatises that contain material both on Ringen and on swordsmanship include those of Fiore dei Liberi (c. 1410), Fabian von Auerswald (1462), Pietro Monte (c. 1480), and Hans Wurm (c. 1500).

Wrestling fell out of fashion among the upper classes with the beginning Baroque period. A late treatise on Ringen is that by Johann Georg Passchen, published in 1659. Maybe the last book which deals with Ringen as a deadly martial art, is possibly "Leib-beschirmende und Feinden Trotz-bietende Fecht-Kunst" from Johann Andreas Schmidt, which was published in Weigel, Nürnberg in 1713. However, Kampfringen did survive at least partly in the folk wrestling styles of the Holy Roman Empire and parts of it still exist within modern wrestling styles such as local German catch wrestling.

== Grappling techniques in swordsmanship ==
Many manuals combine fencing and wrestling into a specialized branch of kampfringen called Ringen am Schwert ("grappling at the sword"), designed to be used during armed combat. This included closing techniques, disarms, weapon-seizures, pommel-strikes, and weapon-aided joint-locks.

Grappling techniques are particularly central to the discipline of armoured fighting (Harnischfechten).

== Mounted grappling ==
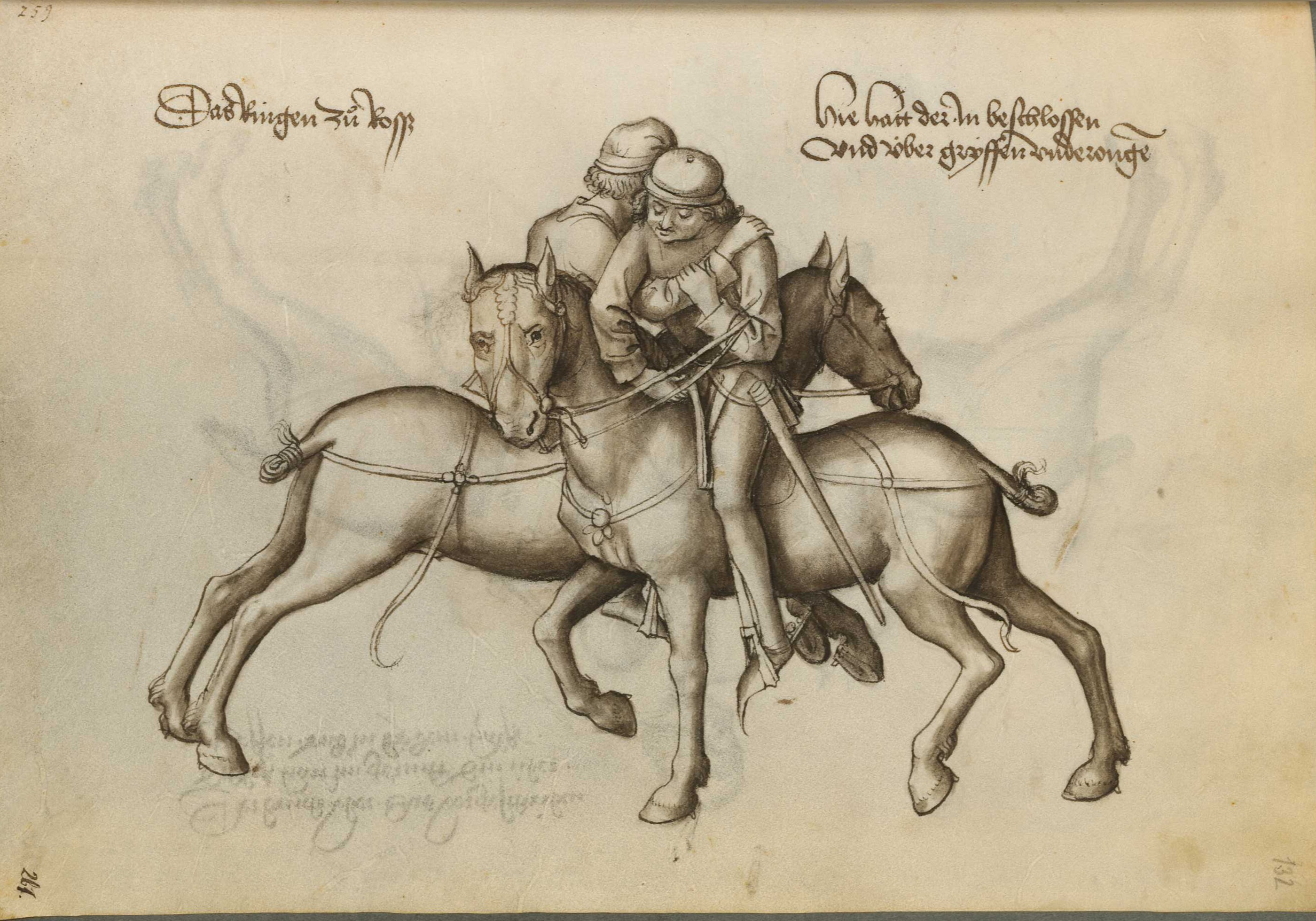
First plate of the mounted grappling (Ringen zu Ross) section in Hans Talhoffer (1467)

Several manuscripts detail grappling techniques for mounted combat or Rossfechten.

== See also ==
- Historical European Martial Arts
- German school of fencing
- Academic fencing
- History of wrestling
- Grappling
- Hand-to-hand combat
