= Le Livre des tournois =

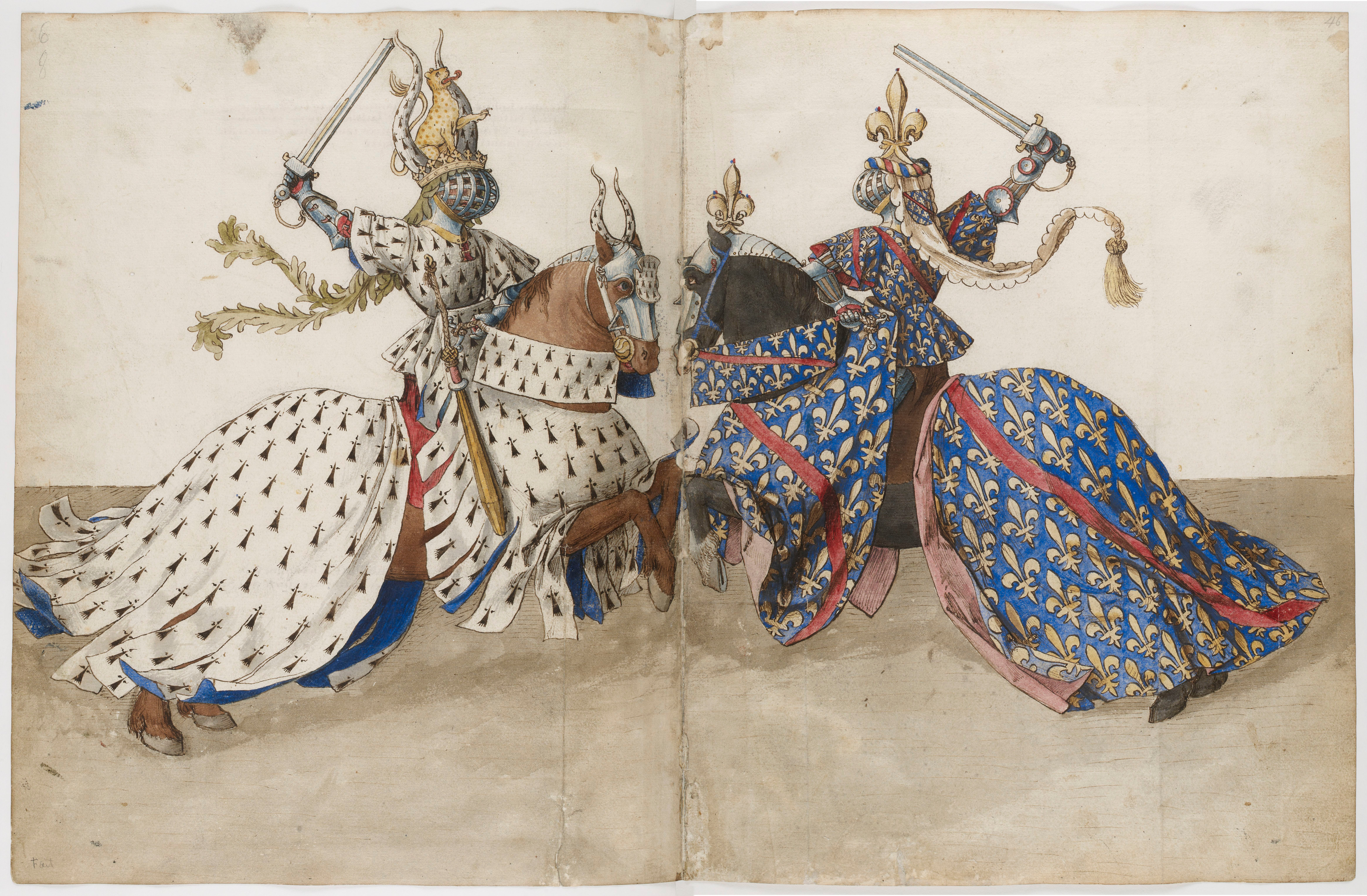
The dukes of Brittany and of Bourbon in single combat (BNF Fr. 2695, double page illustration, foll. 27v/28r); original caption: Icy apres sensuit comant les deux ductz de Bretaigne et de Bourbon sont acheval armoyez et timbrez ainsi qui seront au Tournoy. ("Hereafter follows how the two Dukes of Brittany and of Bourbon on horseback armed and with crests as if they were at the tourney.") Bibliothèque Nationale de France.

Le Livre des tournois (Traicte de la Forme de Devis d'un Tournoi) or King René's Tournament Book is a treatise describing rules for tournaments by the French prince René d'Anjou. It is best known from what appears to be Rene's own illuminated copy from the 1460s, now in the Bibliothèque Nationale, Paris (MS Fr. 2695) with illustrations, or at least the drawings before colouring, attributed to Barthélemy d'Eyck.

The description given in the book is different from that of the pas d'armes held at Razilly and Saumur; conspicuously absent are the allegorical and chivalresque ornamentations that were in vogue at the time. René instead emphasizes he is reporting on ancient tournament customs of France, Germany and the Low Countries, combining them in a new suggestion on how to hold a tournament. The tournament described is a melee fought by two sides. Individual jousts are only briefly mentioned.

In the original BnF manuscript van Eyck did the line drawings, possibly intended as preparatory only, which were later coloured either by him or by another artist. There are twenty-six full and double page illustrations. The BNF also has three illuminated copies of the manuscript made shortly after the original, MS Fr. 2692 is dated to 1488/9, Fr. 2693 to 1480–1488, and Fr. 2696 to c. 1483, plus one early modern copy, Fr. 2694 (17th century).

Formerly, the MS Fr. 2695 manuscript was regarded as directly inspired by a series of tournaments held at the Anjou court at Nancy, Saumur and Tarascon between 1445 and 1450, but it is now considered somewhat younger, dating to the 1460s, not least because the text makes several critical allusions the Traité des anciens et nouveaux tournois written by Antoine de La Sale in 1459. Also, the emblem of the duke of Bourbon is represented as including two white dogs, which had fallen out of use in the 1420s and were only re-introduced by Jean II of Bourbon in 1457. Finally, the paper itself was dated to the 1450s. According to Gautier (2009), the manuscript would have been redacted during 1462–69, when René was at Angers. It was most likely complete before 1471, as an inventory of Angers castle in 1471/2 mentions a cayez de papier en grant volume, ouquel est le commencement d'un tournoy, which has been identified with this manuscript. The manuscript later came into possession of Marie of Luxembourg (d. 1546) and later again of Louis Nicolas Fouquet (d. 1705), then passing to Louis François de Bourbon-Conti and finally to Louis-César de La Baume Le Blanc de La Vallière who in 1766 sold it to the royal library of Louis XV (which became the BNF after 1789).

== See also ==
- Bem cavalgar
- Thurnierbuch
