= Cod. 44 A 8 =

1452 martial arts manual by Peter von Danzig

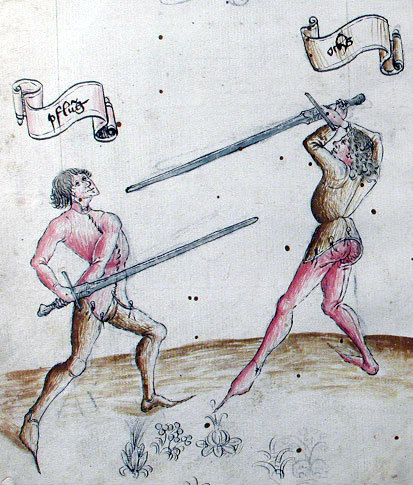
fol. 1v of the MS, depicting two fencers in basic wards.

Cod. 44 A 8 also known as MS 1449, Bibliotheca dell'Academica Nazionale dei Lincei e Corsiniana, is a Fechtbuch compiled by Peter von Danzig in 1452. Danzig was a 15th-century German fencing master. He was counted among the 17 members of the "society of Johannes Liechtenauer".

The book reports teachings of Johannes Liechtenauer, Andres Lignitzer, Martin Hundfeld and Ott Jud, as well as original material by Peter von Danzig.

Andres Lignitzer (Andreas Liegnitzer, Andrew of Liegnitz) was a late 14th- or early 15th-century German fencing master. His teachings are preserved by the mid-15th-century masters Peter von Danzig and Paulus Kal. Paulus Kal names him together with his brother Jacob as being members of the "Liechtenauer society". He may be identical with Andres Jud ("Andres the Jew") named in 3227a.

An English translation of the treatise was published by Tobler (2010).

== See also ==
- Historical European Martial Arts
- German school of swordsmanship

== Literature ==
- Christian Henry Tobler, In Saint George's Name: An Anthology of Medieval German Fighting Arts (2010), ISBN 978-0-9825911-1-6
