= Leal Conselheiro =

1438 treatise by Duarte I

Leal Conselheiro ("Loyal Counselor") is a 1438 philosophical treatise by Portuguese king Duarte I. It considers the moral and spiritual side of living well and the responsibility of governance. In particular, he defends the war against Moors. The treatise also deals with proper etiquette; for example Duarte emphasizes showing absolute respect, obeying one’s father’s wishes, and offering him due veneration, even when one's judgement may be correct. The manuscript with Leal Conselheiro and Bem cavalgar was seized by Charles VIII of France in 1495 and transferred to France. Now it is kept at the French National Library, Paris.
