= Bem cavalgar =

Horsemanship manual by Edward, King of Portugal

1843 book edition.

Bem cavalgar, fully Livro da ensinança de bem cavalgar toda sela ("Book on the instruction of riding well on every saddle"), is a book written by Edward of Portugal, left incomplete as Edward died of a plague in 1438. It is one of the oldest remaining manuals of medieval horsemanship and jousting. Together with Leal Conselheiro, the other book written by King Edward, the manuscript is kept at the French National Library, Paris. It is the basis of the curriculum at the Portuguese School of Equestrian Art, one of the Big Four riding academies.

The book consists of three parts: "on will" (4 chapters), "on force" (2 chapters) and "fourteen recommendations for expert riders", breaking off in the seventh section.

== Literature ==
- The Book of Horsemanship by Duarte I of Portugal. Transl. Jeffrey L. Forgeng. Woodbridge: Boydell and Brewer, 2016. ISBN 978-1-78327-103-0
- The Royal Book of Jousting, Horsemanship and Knightly Combat. Highland Village, TX: The Chivalry Bookshelf, 2005, ISBN 1-891448-34-X
- Piel Joseph M. (ed.), Livro Da Ensinança De Bem Cavalgar Toda Sela que fez Elrey Dom Eduarte de Portugal e do Algarve e Senhor de Ceuta, Lisbon, 1944
- Livro da ensinança de bem cavalgar toda sela, escrito pelo Senhor Dom Duarte, Rei de Portugal e do Algarve e Segnhor de Ceuta, trascrito do manuscrito extante na Biblioteca Real de Paris, Typ. Rollandiana, Lisbon, 1843

== See also ==
- King René's Tournament Book
- Furusiyya
