= Hans von Speyer =

German scribe

Hans von Speyer was a 15th-century German scribe. He was probably born near Speyer, Germany in the mid-15th century. In c. 1491, he produced the MS M.I.29, a fencing manual compiling several significant treatises from the tradition of Johannes Liechtenauer.

In c. 1455, a Hans von Speyer assisted in the creation of the typeface for Johannes Gutenberg's 42-Line Bible, but this may or may not be the same scribe.

== Sources ==
- Transcription and translation of his fechtbuch
- MS M.I.29 - Universitätsbibliothek, Salzburg, Austria
