= Ott Jud =

Ott Jud ("Ott the Jew") was a 15th-century Austrian martial arts master who specialized in grappling (Ringen).

The version of his treatise in Codex Lew states that he was a Christian baptized Jew.

Paulus Kal describes him as the wrestling master to the rulers of Austria and names him as a member of the Society of Liechtenauer.

Ott's treatise on grappling is repeated throughout all of the early German treatise compilations and seems to have become the dominant work on the subject within the Liechtenauer tradition.
