= Nürnberger Handschrift GNM 3227a =

14th-century manuscript

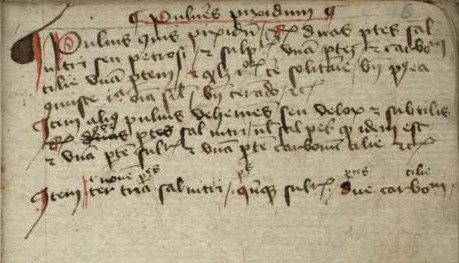
Three paragraphs on making gunpowder (pulveres pixidum), fol. 6r.

Codex 3227a of the Germanisches Nationalmuseum in Nuremberg (also known as Hs. 3227a, GNM 3227a, Nürnberger Handschrift GNM 3227a) is a manuscript of 169 folia, dated to the close of the 14th century. Its text is written in Latin and German. The German portions have been identified as in East Central German dialect.

The composition of the manuscript is sometimes dated to 1389 on the basis of the calendar on fol. 83v which covers the years 1390–1495 (assuming that the scribe compiled the calendar for future reference only), but it has been noted that nothing precludes a date in the first quarter of the 15th century.

By the late 15th century, the manuscript was owned by Nicolaus Pol, who left the inscription Nicolaus Pol doctor 1494. Pol is known as the personal surgeon to the emperors at Innsbruck from 1495. After Pol's death in 1532, his library, presumably including this manuscript, passed to Innichen Abbey in South Tyrol. The fate of the manuscript during the 17th and 18th centuries is unknown, but it was part of the library of Hans Freiherr von und zu Aufsess, from which it passed to the Germanisches Nationalmuseum in 1852.

The manuscript is a pragmatic commonplace book apparently compiled for the scribe's personal use. It is an early example of such a compilation (if indeed it dates to before 1400), and is as such notable as a document of the transition from oral to written tradition during the late medieval period.

The compilation contains notes on an eclectic variety of topics, including alchemy, magical formulas, conjuring tricks, chemical recipes for fireworks, paints, medicine, ironworking, etc.

A substantial portion of the manuscript is a combat manual, making it of particular notability for the study of Historical European Martial Arts. It is the earliest record of the German school of fencing in the tradition of Johannes Liechtenauer. Liechtenauer is here for the first time mentioned by name, and his teachings quoted. His tradition of martial arts, especially the fencing with the longsword would remain influential in Germany throughout the 15th and for much of the 16th century.

The manuscript text had never been edited in print prior to its notability to the Historical European Martial Arts revival. The study of relevant combat treatises was guided by the seminal dissertation by Hils (1985), and the first full transcriptions were published online.

Hils (1985, p. 106) identified Hanko Döbringer as the author of the manuscript, a mistake inherited from the earlier survey by Wierschin (1965). It was inspired by the fact that the name is written on the page margin on fol. 43r. When the manuscript text was edited, it became clear that Döbringer's name was added in the margin because it had been omitted by accident from a list of four "other masters" discussed on that page. This mistake has resulted in the manuscript being also known as "Codex Döbringer" (so Ehlert and Leng 2003) or similar.

Contents:

- 1r - 5v treatise on fireworks (Marcus Graecus: Liber Ignium)
- 5v magic formulas in Latin and German
- 6r recipes for powders used for painting
- 6v - 10v Latin recipes (paint, alchemy, medicine)
- 11r - 12r German instructions for the strengthening of iron (Von dem herten. Nu spricht meister Alkaym...)
- 12v - 13r alchemist recipes in Latin
- 13v - 17v treatise on sword fencing, on foot, on horseback, unarmoured or armoured (kunst des fechtens mit deme swerte czu fusse vnd czu rosse blos vnd yn harnuesche)
- 18r - 40r teachings of Johannes Liechtenauer on unarmoured foot combat. (Liechtenauers blozfechten czu fusse)
- 43r - 45v teachings of other masters, in verse (Hanko Döbringer, Andres Juden, Jost von der Neißen, Nidas Preußen).
- 47r - 48v glosses on technical terms of the preceding section
- 52v on sportive (non-serious) fencing (Schulfechten)
- 53r - 60v teachings of Liechtenauer on combat on horseback and armoured combat with spear and sword.
- 62r fragment on wrestling
- 64r - 65r recapitulation of the teachings of Liechtenauer
- 66v - 73v astrological texts, magical and medicinal recipes, onomatomancy
- 74r fragment on combat with sword and shield
- 74v - 77v recipes for paint, tumors, metal and ivory treatment
- 78r fragment on combat with the long-staff
- 79r - 81v miscellaneous Latin recipes, treatment of gems, preparation of a miraculous potion
- 82 on combat with the long knife (Messer)
- 83v Latin calendar, 1390–1495
- 84r - 85r on combat with the dagger
- 85 magical recipes
- 86r - 89r Liechtenauer on wrestling, interspersed with additional recipes
- 90v - 165v recipes for dental hygiene, various alchemist recipes, food recipes, nonsense recipes, in various hands
- 166r - 169v index to the recipes in the manuscript, partly illegible
