= Sigmund Ringeck =

Sigmund Schining ein Ringeck
- The Glasgow version concludes with this image of a seated master, perhaps a representation of Master Ringeck himself
- Born: unknown
- Died: before ca. 1470
- Occupation: Fencing master
- Writing career
- Language: Early New High German
- Genre: Fencing manual
- Literary movement: Society of Liechtenauer

Sigmund Schining ein Ringeck (Sigmund ain Ringeck, Sigmund Amring, Sigmund Einring, Sigmund Schining) was a German fencing master. While the meaning of the surname "Schining" is uncertain, the suffix "ain Ringeck" may indicate that he came from the Rhineland region of south-western Germany. He is named in the text of his treatise as Schirmaister to one Duke Albrecht, Count Palatine of Rhine and Duke of Bavaria. Other than this, the only thing that can be determined about his life is that his renown as a master was sufficient for Paulus Kal to include him on his memorial to the deceased masters of the Society of Liechtenauer in 1470. Ringeck seems to have authored one of the few complete glosses of the epitome of the grand master Johannes Liechtenauer, making him one of the most important German fencing masters of the 15th century.

The identity of Ringeck's patron remains unclear, as four men named Albrecht held the title during the fifteenth century. If it is Albrecht I, who reigned from 1353 to 1404, this would signify that Ringeck was likely a direct associate or student of Liechtenauer. However, it may just as easily have been Albrecht III, who carried the title from 1438 to 1460, making Ringeck a second- or third-generation master carrying on the tradition. Albrecht IV claimed the title in 1460 and thus also could have been Ringeck's patron; this seems less likely in light of Ringeck's apparent death within that same decade, meaning the master would have had to have penned his treatise in the final few years of his life. In its favor, however, is the fact that Albrecht IV reigned until 1508 and both the Dresden and Glasgow versions of the text were likely created during his time.

== Writings ==
Ringeck is often erroneously credited as the author of the MS Dresden C487. While Ringeck seems to be the author of three of the core texts, glosses of Liechtenauer's verses on unarmored longsword fencing, armored fencing, and mounted fencing, the manuscript is an anthology of several treatises by different masters and is currently thought to have been composed between 1504 and 1519 (well after the master's lifetime). Likewise, the MS E.1939.65.341, though often described as merely an illustrated version of the Dresden manuscript, is a separate anthology with its own collection of works by various authors and is internally dated to 1508.

While it was not copied nearly as often as the more famous Anonymous gloss (often misattributed to Peter von Danzig), Ringeck's gloss nevertheless seems to have had a lasting influence. Not only was it reproduced by Joachim Meyer in 1570 as part of his final manuscript, but in 1539 Hans Medel von Salzburg took it upon himself to create a revised version of Ringeck's Bloßfechten gloss, integrating his own commentary in many places.

== See also ==
- Historical European Martial Arts
- German school of swordsmanship

== Literature ==
- Lindholm, David and Svard, Peter. Sigmund Ringeck's Knightly Art of the Longsword. Boulder, CO: Paladin Press, 2003. ISBN 978-1-58160-410-8
- Lindholm, David and Svard, Peter. Sigmund Ringeck's Knightly Arts of Combat: Sword-and-Buckler Fighting, Wrestling, and Fighting in Armor. Boulder, CO: Paladin Press, 2006. ISBN 978-1-58160-499-3
- Tobler, Christian Henry. Secrets of German Medieval Swordsmanship. Highland Village, TX: Chivalry Bookshelf, 2001. ISBN 1-891448-07-2
