= William Morris Society =

British organisation

Coordinates: 51.4905°N 0.2355°W

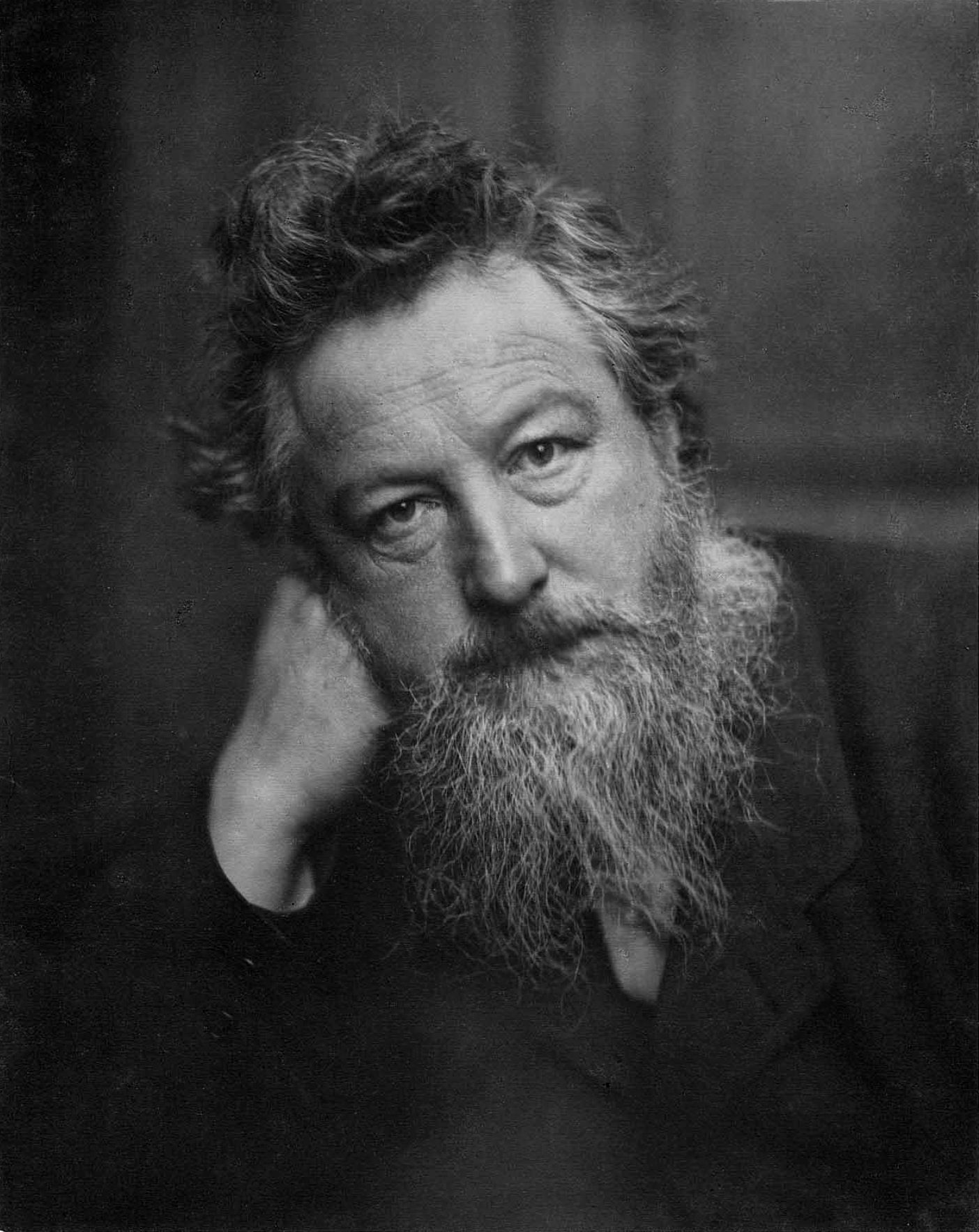
William Morris by Frederick Hollyer, 1887

The William Morris Society was founded in 1955 in London, England. The Society's office and museum are located at Kelmscott House, Hammersmith, where Morris lived from 1879 until his death in 1896.

The Society aims to make more well-known the life and work of the Victorian designer, artist, writer, and socialist William Morris (1834–1896) and his associates. The Society's activities include conferences, educational activities, lectures, museum visits, social events, and tours. The Society also publishes books and pamphlets dealing with the life and work of Morris, a quarterly members' newsletter and, twice a year, the Journal of William Morris Studies (founded in 1961 as the Journal of the William Morris Society).

The Society is a registered charity under English law.

The associated William Morris Society of Canada was founded in 1981 and is based in Toronto, Ontario.

The affiliated William Morris Society in the United States was founded in New York in 1971 and is now based in Washington DC.

== See also ==
- William Morris Gallery
