= Johannes Liechtenauer =

German fencing master

Johannes Liechtenauer's art of fencing
- Liechtenauer's zedel
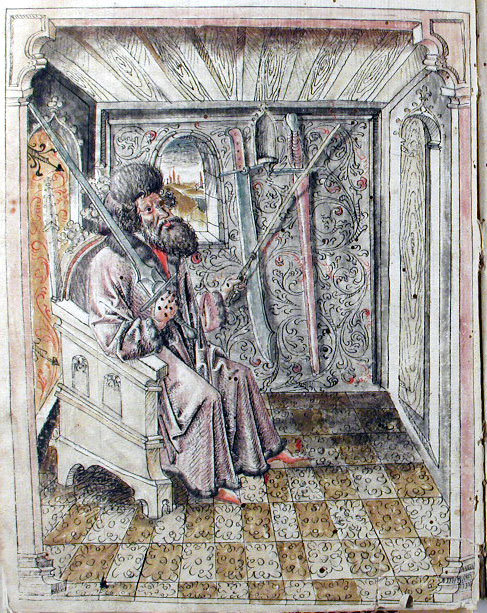
- This image of a seated master precedes the gloss of Liechtenauer's teachings in the Codex 44A.8.
- Ascribed to: Johannes Liechtenauer
- Language: Middle High German
- Date: 14th century
- State of existence: oral tradition, fixed in several versions beginning c. 1400
- Principal manuscript(s): List of manuscripts: Hs. 3227a; Cod. 44.A.8; Cod. I.6.4°.3; Ms. Thott.290.2º; Cod. guelf. 78.2 Aug.2°; Ms. M.I.29; Ms. Dresd. C.487; Ms. E.1939.65.341; Ms. Germ. Quart. 2020; Cod.icon. 393; Cod. 10825/10826; M. Dresd. C.93/94

Johannes Liechtenauer (also Lichtnauer, Hans Lichtenawer) was a German fencing master who had a great level of influence on the German fencing tradition in the 14th century.

== Biography ==
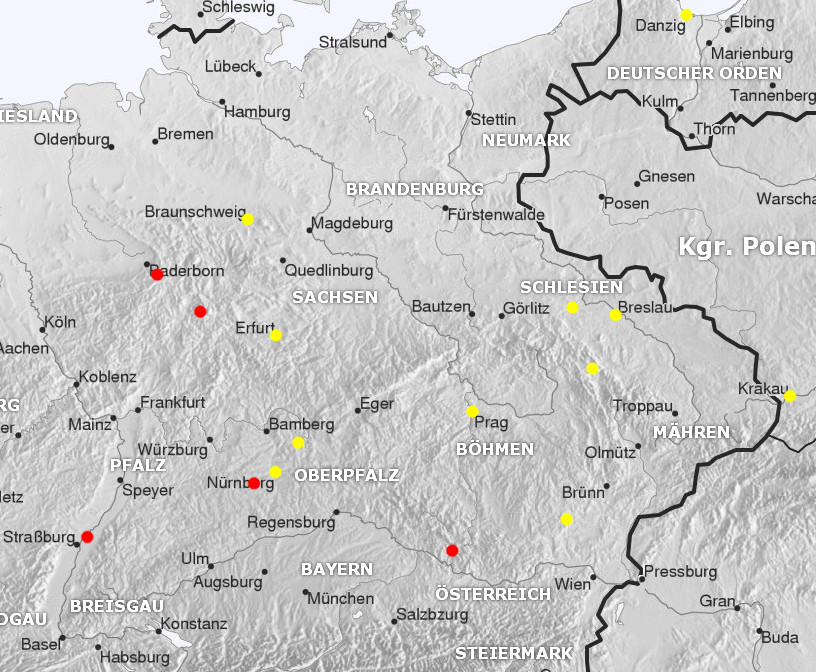
Candidate locations called Lichtenau (in red) and places of origin of members of the Society of Liechtenauer (in yellow) in 14th-century Central Europe (following Massmann 1844).

Liechtenauer seems to have been active during the mid-to-late 14th century. The only extant biographical note on Liechtenauer is found in GNM Hs. 3227a (dated c. 1400), which states that "Master Liechtenauer learnt and mastered [the art of the sword] in a thorough and rightful way, but he did not invent it or make it up himself, as it is stated before. Instead, he travelled across and visited many lands for the sake of this rightful and true art, as he wanted to study and know it."

His surname indicates he was from a place called Liechtenau (modern Lichtenau). There are several places with this name. Massmann (1844) mentions five candidate locations: Lichtenau im Mühlkreis in Upper Austria; Lichtenau in Franconia, Nuremberg; Lichtenau on the Rhine, Baden, near Strasbourg; Lichtenau in Hesse; and Lichtenau in Westphalia, near Paderborn. Of these he treats as the most likely Franconian Lichtenau, because Nuremberg was a center of later (Renaissance-era) fencing, and Lichtenau in Upper Austria, because of the geographical provenance suggested by the members of the Society of Liechtenauer.

== The Zettel (epitome) ==
Liechtenauer's students preserved his teaching in the form of a mnemonic poem (called the Zettel, Early New High German zedel, a German word corresponding to English schedule, in the sense of "brief written summary"; translated "epitome" by Tobler 2010). Later in the 15th century, parts of these verses become widely known, and by the 16th century are incorporated into the general tradition of German fencing.

The term zedel is used in the manuscripts associated with the Society of Liechtenauer in the mid-15th century. Its earliest known use found in Cod. 44 A 8 (dated 1452, fol. 9v):

Alhÿe hebt sich an dye zedel der Ritterlichen kunst des fechtens dye do geticht vnd gemacht hat Johans Liechtenawer der ain hocher maister In den künsten gewesen ist dem got genadig seÿ
"Here begin the zedel of the knightly art of fencing, which were composed and made by Johannes Liechtenauer, who was a high master in the arts, and on whom God may have mercy."

The Zettel were apparently intended as a list of mnemonic aids to help the student remember concepts he had been taught orally. They do not "explain" the technique in any detail. On the contrary, the verses are intentionally cryptic and are described as "secret and hidden words" by later masters, who assure us that their opaque wording was intended to prevent the uninitiated from discovering the techniques described therein. These verses were treated as the core of the art by Liechtenauer's followers, and the earliest fencing manuals of the Liechtenauer school, beginning with Hs. 3227a and followed by the treatises of Peter von Danzig zum Ingolstadt, Jud Lew, and Sigmund Schining ein Ringeck in the 15th century, are organized such that each couplet or quatrain is given first, followed by a gloss or detailed explanation of its intended meaning.

The Zettel are organized as follows:

- a general introduction to the art of fighting
- a general introduction to fighting with the long sword (the sword held with both hands on the grip)
- a division into seventeen parts or techniques (also known as Liechtenauer's "17 chief pieces" or Hauptstücke) of fighting with the long sword.

The general introduction is ethical as well as practical and begins as follows:

Jung Ritter lere / got lip haben / frawen io ere /
So wechst dein ere / Uebe ritterschaft und lere /
Kunst dy dich czyret / vnd in krigen sere hofiret /

Young knight, learn to love God and honour women,
so grows your honour; practice chivalry and learn
art which adorns you and will glorify you in battle.

Liechtenauer's seventeen "chief pieces" (Hauptstücke) are:

- five "master strikes" or "hidden strikes": 1. Zornhau, 2. Krumphau, 3. Zwerchhau, 4. Schielhau, 5. Scheitelhau
- the four guards (Huten or Leger), called "plough" (Pflug), "ox" (Ochs), vom tag and "the fool" (Alber).
- a list of techniques: Versetzen, Nachreisen, Überlaufen, Absetzen, Durchwechseln, Zucken, Durchlaufen (grappling), Abschneiden, Händedrücken four Hängen, twenty-four Winden.

Liechtenauer is also cited as the originator of similar teachings in other disciplines, including fighting on horseback armored dueling or Kampffechten and wrestling, besides fragmentary allusions to other material, such as fighting with the dagger, the messer and the small shield, in ms. 3227a. Liechtenauer's actual authorship of this material is however doubtful. It seems more likely that Liechtenauer's contribution is limited to the unarmoured fencing with the long sword, while other masters specialized in other disciplines; the verses on armoured and mounted combat are likely due to Andreas Liegnitzer, Martin Hundsfeld or Jud Lew, while the verses on wrestling are mostly attributed to Ott Jud.

In addition to the Zettel on mounted fencing, several treatises in the Liechtenauer tradition include a group of twenty-six "figures"—single line abbreviations of select couplets and quatrains that seem to summarize them. A parallel set of teachings was recorded by Andre Paurñfeyndt in 1516 called the "Twelve Teachings for the Beginning Fencer"., These teachings are also generally abbreviations of longer passages from the long sword Zettel, and are similarly repeated in many treatises throughout the 16th century. Thus, it may be that the figures are a mnemonic that represent the initial stage of mounted fencing instruction, and that the full verse was learned only afterward.

== Society of Liechtenauer ==
The Society of Liechtenauer (Geselschaft Liechtenauers) is a list of seventeen masters found in the introduction to the three oldest copies of Paulus Kal's fencing manual. It is unclear if this was ever a formal organization or what its nature might have been; however, it is commonly speculated that the list is a memorial to deceased students and associates of the grand master. Of particular interest is the international nature of the list, including masters from present-day Austria, Czech Republic, Germany, and Poland, which parallels the statement in the MS 3227a that Liechtenauer himself traveled to many lands to learn the art. Several masters from this list are known to have written fencing treatises, but about half remain completely unknown.

Paulus Kal lists the members of the Society as follows:

hanns liechtenawer	Johannes Liechtenauer
peter wildigans von glacz	Peter Wildigans of Glatz
peter von tanczk	Peter von Danzig
hanns spindler von cznaÿm	Hans Spindler of Znaim
lamprecht von prag	Lamprecht of Prague
hanns seyden faden von erfürt	Hans Seydenfaden of Erfurt
andre liegniczer	Andre Lignitzer
iacob liegniczer	Jacob Lignitzer
sigmund amring	Sigmund Schining ein Ringeck
hartman von nurñberg	Hartman of Nuremberg
martein hunczfeld	Martin Hundsfeld
hanns pägnüczer	Hans Pegnitzer
phÿlips perger	Philips Perger
virgilÿ von kracå	Virgil of Kraków
dietherich degen vechter von brawnschweig	Dieterich, the dagger-fighter of Brunswick
ott iud, der der her[e]n von o[e]sterreicher ringer gewessen ist.	Ott Jud, who was wrestler to the lords of Austria
Der edel vnd fest Stettner der am maisten der maister aller Schüeler gewesen ist vnd ich maister pauls kall pin sein Schüeler gewesen	the noble and constant [Hans] Stettner, who was the foremost master of all scholars, and I, Paulus Kal, was his student

== See also ==
- German school of swordsmanship
- Historical European Martial Arts
- Fiore dei Liberi

== Literature ==
- Fürgut, Alexander, The Schielhau in Detail: A comprehensive guide about the fundamentals, tactics, and strategy of this longsword technique, ISBN 3982605539 (2025)
- Hils, Hans-Peter. Meister Johann Liechtenauers Kunst des langen Schwertes. P. Lang, 1985. ISBN 978-3-8204-8129-7
- Tobler, Christian Henry. In Saint George's Name: An Anthology of Medieval German Fighting Arts. Wheaton, IL: Freelance Academy Press, 2010. ISBN 978-0-9825911-1-6
- Tobler, Christian Henry. In Service of the Duke: The 15th Century Fighting Treatise of Paulus Kal. Highland Village, TX: The Chivalry Bookshelf, 2006. ISBN 978-1-891448-25-6
- Tobler, Christian Henry. Secrets of German Medieval Swordsmanship. Highland Village, TX: The Chivalry Bookshelf, 2001. ISBN 1-891448-07-2
- Hull, Jeffrey, with Maziarz, Monika and Żabiński, Grzegorz. Knightly Dueling: The Fighting Arts of German Chivalry. Boulder, CO: Paladin Press, 2007. ISBN 978-1581606744
- Wierschin, Martin (in German). Meister Johann Liechtenauers Kunst des Fechtens. Munich: C. H. Beck, 1965.
- Żabiński, Grzegorz. The Longsword Teachings of Master Liechtenauer. The Early Sixteenth Century Swordsmanship Comments in the "Goliath" Manuscript. Poland: Adam Marshall, 2010. ISBN 978-83-7611-662-4
- Żabiński, Grzegorz. "Unarmored Longsword Combat by Master Liechtenauer via Priest Döbringer." Masters of Medieval and Renaissance Martial Arts. Ed. Jeffrey Hull. Boulder, CO: Paladin Press, 2008. ISBN 978-1-58160-668-3
