= Paulus Kal =

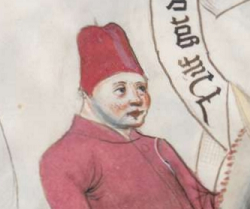
- Born: c. 1420s Dingolfing, Germany
- Died: after 1485
- Occupations: Fencing master Toll collector
- Writing career
- Language: Early New High German; Neo-Latin
- Genres: Fencing manual Wrestling manual
- Notable works: List of manuscripts: Ms. 1825 (1458-1467); Cgm 1507 (c. 1470); MS KK5126 (c. 1480); MS Chart.B.1021 (1473-1503); Gotti MS (late 15th century); Codex S.554 (1506-1514); Codex Icon 393 (1550s)
- Literary movement: Society of Liechtenauer

Paulus Kal was a 15th-century German fencing master. According to his own testimony, he was the student of one Hans Stettner, who was in turn an initiate of the tradition of Johannes Liechtenauer. He served as fencing master at three different courts in his career, serving in various military capacities including commanding men in at least three campaigns. Perhaps his most significant legacy is an honor role of deceased masters included in the Bologna (Ms. 1825) and Munich (Cgm 1507) versions of his treatise, which he styled the Society of Liechtenauer (Geselschaft Liechtenauers). While several of these masters remain unknown, the majority wrote treatises of their own and Kal's list stands as an independent confirmation of their connection to the grand master. Kal's treatise is also interesting in that it represents the first attempt to give pictorial illustrations for parts of Liechtenauer's tradition of fencing.

== Life ==
Little is known of Kal's early life, but from 1440 to c. 1449 he served Louis IV of the House of Wittelsbach, Count Palatine of the Rhine. In 1448, while in the count's service he participated in the defense Nuremberg, commanding a unit of wheel cannons below the gates. The Nuremberg Council notes from 17 March 1449 mention that he had broken the peace of the city at that time by drawing his weapons.

Kal entered the service of Ludwig IX "the Rich" of the House of Wittelsbach, Duke of Bavaria-Landshut, on 29 September 1450. In 1461, he is mentioned commanding a unit of 12 marksmen. From 1465 to 1475, he seems to have also maintained a secondary occupation as a toll collector in Dingolfing. In November 1468, he participated in military actions on the Castle Saldenburg, which was successfully taken on 4 December. Shortley thereafter, in c. 1470, Paulus Kal created a second, expanded version of his fencing manual for Ludwig IX, the current Cgm 1507 (as well, possibly, as the MS 1825). Kal is listed as a guest at the wedding of Ludwig's son George, and continued in the duke's service until his death on 18 January 1479.

On 12 February 1480, Paulus Kal entered the service of Sigismund, Archduke of Austria. Kal acted as one of the archduke's witnesses at a number of interrogations held on 17 October 1485 in Innsbruck, related to the witch trials being conducted by Heinrich Kramer at that time. This is the final time that Kal's name appears in the histories. Several copies of Kal's treatise were created during the 1480s and 90s, including the extensive MS KK5126, but it is unknown if he directly commissioned any of them.

In total, Paulus Kal's teachings are preserved in at least six manuscripts written between 1440 and 1514. The probable archetype, Cgm 1507, includes brief explanations in German for most devices (many extracted from Liechtenauer's record). There are four other text-less versions, and these were probably copied from the 1470 version. A sixth version was sold at auction in Italy during the 20th century as individual leaves; this copy contains single-word captions in Latin or Italian and was likely based on one of the four without text. In addition, Paulus Hector Mair based content in several sections of the Munich version (Cod.icon. 393) of his Opus Amplissimum de Arte Athletica on Kal's treatise. It appears that the copy he used for this was textless, and so he added his own extensive commentary on the images. The precise set of images Mair drew upon do not appear in any of the six extant manuscripts, which may signify that there was once a seventh copy of Kal's work which has since been lost.

== See also ==
- Historical European Martial Arts
- German school of swordsmanship

== Literature ==
- Studer, Charles (in German). Das Solothurner Fechtbuch. Zentralbibliothek Solothurn, 1989.
- Tobler, Christian Henry. In Saint George's Name: An Anthology of Medieval German Fighting Arts. Wheaton, IL: Freelance Academy Press, 2010. ISBN 978-0-9825911-1-6
- Tobler, Christian Henry. In Service of the Duke: The 15th Century Fighting Treatise of Paulus Kal. Highland Village, TX: Chivalry Bookshelf, 2006. ISBN 978-1-891448-25-6
