= Outline of fencing =

Overview of and topical guide to fencing

The following outline is provided as an overview of and topical guide to fencing, a family of combat sports using bladed weapons. Fencing is one of four sports which have been featured at every one of the modern Olympic Games.

== Fencing ==
Fencing can be described as all of the following:

- Form of combat (fighting) – purposeful violent conflict meant to weaken, establish dominance over, or kill the opposition, or to drive the opposition away from a location where it is not wanted or needed.
  - Form of hand-to-hand combat – lethal or non-lethal physical confrontation between two or more persons at very short range (grappling distance) that does not involve the use of firearms or other distance weapons.
- Martial art – codified system and tradition of combat practices, which are practiced for a variety of reasons: self-defense, competition, physical health and fitness, entertainment, as well as mental, physical, and spiritual development.
- Sport – form of competitive physical activity which, through casual or organised participation, aim to use, maintain or improve physical fitness and provide entertainment to participants or spectators.
  - Contact sport – involve a degree of player-to-player or player-to-object contact.
    - Combat sport – competitive contact sport where two combatants fight against each other using specialized rules of engagement, typically with the aim of simulating real hand-to-hand combat in some way.
  - Competitive sport – sport in which one or more participants or teams compete against one another. The one that is the most successful in achieving the objective of the game or sport event is the winner.
    - Amateur sport – competitive sport in which participants engage largely or entirely without remuneration.
    - Individual sport – sport in which participants compete as individuals.
  - Recreational sport – sport engaged in as a leisure time activity.
  - Spectator sport – sport that is characterized by the presence of spectators, or watchers, at its matches. Spectator sports are a form of entertainment.

== Types of fencing ==
A foil fencer. Valid target (the torso) is in red.

A sabre fencer. Valid target (everything from the waist up, including the arms and head) is in red.

An Épée fencer. Valid target (the entire body) is in red.

- Foil fencing – uses a foil, a light thrusting weapon, targeting the torso, including the back, but not the arms. Touches are scored only with the tip; hits with the side of the blade do not count, and do not halt the action. Touches that land outside of the target area (off-target) stop the action, and are not scored. Only a single hit can be scored by either fencer at one time. If both fencers hit at the same time, the referee uses the rules of right of way to determine which fencer gets the point.
- Sabre fencing – uses a saber, a light cutting and thrusting weapon, targeting the entire body above the waist, excluding the off hand. Hits with the edges of the blade as well as the tip are valid. As in foil, touches which land outside of the target area are not scored. However, unlike foil, these off-target touches do not stop the action, and the fencing continues. In the case of both fencers landing a scoring touch, the referee determines which fencer receives the point for the action, again through the use of "right of way".
- Épée fencing – uses an épée, a heavier thrusting weapon, targeting the entire body. All hits must be with the tip and not the sides of the blade. Touches hit by the side of the blade do not halt the action. Unlike foil and sabre, Épée does not use right of way, and allows simultaneous hits by both fencers. However, if the score is tied at the last point and a double touch is scored, nobody is awarded the point. In addition to it, épée fencing requires a deeper understanding of distance and timing, as fencers must carefully manage their attacks and defenses to avoid double touches in the game, particularly in high-stakes situations.

== History of fencing ==
- History of fencing
  - Predecessors of modern fencing weapons
    - Khopesh
    - Bronze Age sword
    - Rondel dagger
    - Longsword
    - Rapier
    - Small sword
    - History of the foil
    - History of the épée
  - Historical European Martial Arts
    - Italian school of swordsmanship
      - Bolognese Swordsmanship
    - French school of fencing
      - Ecole Française d'Escrime
    - German influence
      - Fechtbuch
      - German masters
        - Johannes Liechtenauer
        - Paulus Hector Mair
        - Joachim Meyer
    - Classical fencing
    - Academic fencing (or "Mensur")
    - History of dueling
- History of martial arts

== Facilities ==
- Piste – The fencing area, roughly 14 by 2 metres (45.9 ft × 6.6 ft). The last two metres on each end is hash-marked, to warn a fencer before he/she backs off the end of the strip. Retreating off the end of the strip with both feet gets a touch against. Going off the side of the strip with one foot halts the fencing action. Going off the side with both feet gets a penalty of the loss of one metre. After each touch, fencers begin again at the center of the strip, 4 metres apart.

== Equipment and gear ==
=== Weapons ===
==== Olympic weapons and their parts ====
- Épée – A fencing weapon with triangular cross-section blade and a large bell guard; also a light dueling sword of similar design, popular in the mid-19th century, which was also called an 'Épée de Terrain.'
- Foible – The top third of the blade. This section of the blade is weaker in terms of leverage, and is used for beats, presses, and other motions where speed is needed and leverage is not crucial.
- Foil – A fencing weapon with rectangular cross-section blade and a small bell guard. More generally, any sword that has been buttoned or had its point turned back to render it less dangerous for practice.
- Forte – The bottom third of the blade, so named for the strength in leverage that it provides. Always perform your parries with the forte. Hitting the opponent with the forte is not recommended.
- French Grip – A traditional hilt with a slightly curved grip and a large pommel.
- Guard – also Bell and Bell Guard. A Cup-shaped metal (steel or aluminum) weapon part which protects the hand. Foils use small concentrically mounted bell guards, épées use larger offset-mounted bell guards, and sabres have a knuckle guard that wraps around the hilt to protect from cuts to the hand.
- Hilt – Everything that you hold. The handle of a sword, consisting of guard, grip, and pommel.
- Maraging steel – A special steel alloy used for making blades rated for international competition. Usually stronger and more durable than conventional carbon-steel blades, but more importantly, it tends to break less frequently than carbon-steel blades. This is because propagation of micro-cracks in the blade is approximately 10 times slower in maraging steel than in carbon-steel. It is a fencing urban myth that a maraging steel blade is designed to break flat; the breakage patterns are identical. Both maraging and non-maraging blades break with the same degree of jaggedness. The sole reason for requiring a maraging steel blade (or a non-maraging one that has the same longevity under FIE testing) is that less blade breaks equals less potential for follow-on injury.
- Pistol Grip – A modern, orthopedic grip, often shaped vaguely like a small pistol (generally with more protrusions than a real pistol's grip). Varieties are known by names such as Belgian, German, Russian, and Visconti. Orthopedic grips were introduced to aid a fencer who has lost some fingers and was unable to use a traditional grip.
- Point – In foil and épée, the point is the only part of the blade with which to score points. The point may also be used in sabre.
- Pommel – From the old French word for 'apple'. This fastener affixes the grip and guard to the tang of the blade. It has female threading, but the threaded hole does not go all the way through as is the case with a nut. It is screwed onto the distal end of the tang, locking guard, grip and electric connector is position by compression and friction. The pommel traditionally acts as a counterweight on non-orthopedic grips of foils and épées, and on all sabres. In electric sabre, it is covered with plastic as to not interfere with the detection of valid hits by allowing stray currents. Orthopedic (pistol-grip) weapons use only a pommel nut, usually fitting inside a cylindrical hole in the grip.
- Sabre – A fencing weapon with a flat blade and knuckle guard, used with cutting or thrusting actions; a military sword popular in the 18th to 20th centuries; any cutting sword used by cavalry. The modern fencing sabre is descended from the dueling sabre of Italy and Germany, which was straight and thin with sharp edges, but had a blunt end.

==== Non-Olympic weapons and styles ====
- Backsword – A type of heavy sabre, generally single-edged with a 'false edge' down the top third of the back of the blade. Typified by a basket hilt. In use from the 16th to 20th centuries.
- Broadsword – A military sword and fencing weapon popular in the 18th-19th centuries, similar to a heavy sabre. Beginning only in the late 20th century, this term came to be inappropriately applied to almost any straight-bladed, double-edged, single-handed cutting sword, especially of the Medieval and Renaissance eras.
- Longsword – also Hand-and-a-half Sword. A larger cutting sword that could be use with one or two hands. Manuals detailing the use of such swords are among the earliest extant, dating back to the 14th Century.
- Great Sword – also Two-handed Sword. A very large cutting sword, generally double-edged, intended for use with both hands. Great Swords could be as tall as the swordsman, and were often used as front-line offensive weapons in late 17th Century warfare.
- Italian Grip – A traditional hilt with finger rings and crossbar. Used only in foil and épée. The Italian grip provides more 'grip' than the French grip, but less than a 'pistol-grip'. The finger rings and crossbar are descendants of the swords that used quillions. This type of grip is rarely, if ever, used in Olympic-style fencing.
- Quillion – also Quillon, Cross-guard. A bar that composes all or part of the guard of a sword. The quillions (usually two) extend from the hilt of the sword, perpendicular to the line of the blade, on the same plane as the edge(s) of the blade. In simple medieval swords, the quillions usually form the entire guard. In later, more complex hilts, rings and other protective structures were extended in front of the quillions. One or two fingers can be wrapped around the quillions, providing better control of the weapon. In modern fencing weapons, the Italian grip is the only one that retains quillions.
- Rapier – A long, double-edged thrusting sword popular in the 16th-17th centuries. Rapiers began as swords which were designed to use the point, in addition to heavy cuts. Some consider the 'estoc' a precursor to the rapier. As the styles of combat changed, and heavy armor was lightened, the rapier became more focused on the use of the point, and less on heavy cutting strokes. Hilts were designed to allow the forefinger to wrap around a quillion and provide better control. Hilts could be of complex 'swelp-hilt' design, or shaped like a deep cup.
- Ricasso – An unsharpened portion of the blade in front of the quillions. In complex rapier and smallsword hilts, the ricasso is behind the guard, or the forward portion of the hilt.
- Smallsword – Also court sword. A light dueling sword popular in the 18th century. These were, as often as not, a fashion accessory as much as a gentleman's weapon, and were decorated as such.

=== Other equipment or gear ===
- Body Cord – The insulated wire that runs under a fencer's jacket, connecting the Electrical Competition weapon to the reel, and thence to the scoring machine. The body cord also connects to the lamé causing it to become conductive.
  - Three Prong – A type of épée body wire/connector.
  - Two Prong – A type of body-wire/connector, used in foil and sabre.
- Lamé – The electrically conductive jacket worn by Foil and Sabre fencers. In foil, the lamé extends on the torso from the shoulders to the groin area. It also covers the back. In sabre, the lamé covers both arms, the torso from the shoulders to the waist, and the back. Sabreurs also wear a conductive glove cover, called a manchette on their weapon hand. The lamé is connected to the body cord with an alligator clip causing it to be conductive.
- Manchette – A special glove cover worn by sabre fencers, on their weapon hand. Covered by a type of brocaded fabric with inwoven metal threads that serve as a conductive surface that aides in the practice of electric fencing, the manchette is worn on the hand and wrist. The manchette is conducting up to but not exceeding the wrist area. It is worn in conjunction with a lamé.
- Plastron – Also Underarm Protector. A partial garment worn under the jacket for padding or for safety. Usually Consists of a sleeve and a chest/abdomen covering, which provides additional padding and protection. An 'underarm' plastron is seamless under the weapon arm, providing no weak seams for a broken blade to rip through. An 'over-plastron' is worn to provide additional padding.

== Bouting ==
- Assault – A friendly combat between two fencers, where score may or may not be kept, and is generally not a part of any competition. Public exhibitions (spectator events) used to be often conducted as assaults, rather than as round-robin or direct-elimination events, especially with a few fencers. (See also Bout).
- Bout – An assault at which the score is kept. Usually refers to a match between two fencers in a competition. This is the term used in the US to generally denote any combat between fencers, replacing the terms 'match' and 'assault'.
- Corps-à-corps – (French "body-to-body") The action of two fencers coming into physical contact with one another with any portion of their bodies or hilts. This is illegal in foil and sabre bouts, and is cause for the Referee (Director) to halt the fencing action. In épée, it does not violate the spirit of the game, but contact may not be accompanied with any brutality or forcefulness (intentional or not).
- Double – A double touch. in épée, two attacks that arrive within 40-50 ms of each other. This time margin is handled by the scoring machines, which lock out any touches after the time limit. Double touches are not allowed in foil and sabre.
- Dry (USA) / Steam (UK) – Fencing without electric scoring aids. 'Dry' weapons have plastic or rubber buttons on the tips.
- Match – The aggregate of bouts between two fencing teams.
- Salute – A gesture of respect and civility performed with the weapon. Performed at the start and end of a bout (match, assault, etc.), and also at the start and end of a lesson. At the start of a bout, it is traditional, and expected, to salute the adversary, the referee of the bout, any additional judges for the bout, and then, optionally, others (the timekeeper, scorekeeper, etc.). The FIE rules now state that failure to salute an opponent and shake his/her hand at the end of a bout is an offense punishable by removing a touch, and therefore, possibly, the bout.
- Salut des armes – A sort of a choreographed demonstration of arms, consisting of sets of fencers saluting, attacking, parrying, drilling and performing set routines in chorus.

=== Officiating and rules enforcement ===
- Avertissement – (French) A warning; used to indicate a minor rule infraction by one of the fencers. See Yellow Card
- Black Card – A severe penalty. A black card is used to indicate the most serious offences in a fencing competition. The offending fencer is expelled immediately from the event or tournament, regardless of whether he or she had any prior warnings. A black card can also be used to expel a third party disrupting the match.
- Jury – The 4 officials, or judges, who watch for hits in a dry fencing bout. The judges watch for hits on the fencer opposite their end of the strip. A judge acknowledges a hit by raising his or her hand, attracting the attention of the referee (or president of the jury). A judge cannot interpret the right-of-way (foil and sabre), only vote on the touches as described by the referee. In electronically scored foil bouts, hand-judges can be used to watch for a fencer who may be covering valid target area with the unarmed hand. The Jury is hardly used anymore because of electric fencing and replays where the referee can watch again to see who made the touch.
- Red Card – Used to indicate repeated minor rule infractions or a major rule infraction by one of the fencers; results in a point being given to the other fencer, and often the annulment of any touch which would have been made by the offending fencer.
- Referee – also director, president. The mediator of the fencing bout.
- Yellow Card – also avertissement, warning. Used to indicate a minor rule infraction by one of the fencers.

== Tactics and techniques ==
- Fencing tactics

=== Footwork ===
- Advance – The 'advance' is the basic forward movement. The front foot moves first, beginning by lifting the toes. Straighten the leg at the knee, pushing the heel out in front. Land on the heel, and then bring the back foot up to en garde stance. Also, the term advance is used in general for any movement forward by either step, cross, or ballestra.
- Advance-Lunge – An advance followed immediately by a lunge.
- Appel – Stamping the front foot to the ground, to produce a sound to distract or startle the opponent. This may be made during an advance, or directly from an en garde position. It may precede a lunge, or be used merely as a distraction. An appel is also sometimes called a 'half-Advance'. This action may also be used to halt a bout, often by stamping the trailing foot insistently.
- Balestra – A footwork consisting of a jump forwards immediately followed by a lunge. It is faster than a step lunge, which helps to change the rhythm and the timing of the fencing phrase. 'Balestra' is the Italian word for crossbow.
- Cross Over – An advance or retreat by crossing one leg over the other; see also Pass Forward (passe' avant) and Pass Backwards (passe arriere).
- Flèche – Flèche means 'arrow' in French. The rear leg is brought in front of the front leg and the fencer sprints past his/her opponent. This action is not allowed during sabre bouts, because the front and rear legs must not cross. In épée, a quick pass is essential, since the defending fencer is allowed one attack after the pass, so long as the defender's attack is in one action, with or without a parry, initiated before the pass is completed.
- Forward Recovery – A recovery from a lunge, performed by pulling the rear leg up into en garde, rather than pulling the front leg and body backwards. Can be used to gain ground on the opponent more secretly than a standard advance, and when used sparingly can surprise the opponent by changing the expected distance between fencers.
- In Quartata – An evasive action that is recognized under category of the defensive actions ( see also "Passata-sotto"), and made with a quarter turn to the inside, concealing the front but exposing the back. This attempts to move some of the target out of harm's way during an attack or a counter-attack. This evasive action is often executed and used in conjunction with opposition parry.
- Lunge – A forward movement made by advancing the front foot and straightening the back leg. One of the most basic and common attacking movements in modern fencing.
- Pass Backwards – also Passe Arriere. A backwards footwork action. The front foot moves behind the rear foot on the body's outside. Landing on the ball of the front foot, the rear foot moves backwards to the 'en garde' stance.
- Pass Forward – also Passe Avant. A forwards footwork action. The rear foot moves in front of forward foot on the body's inside. From the crossed position, the front foot moves forward into the 'en garde' stance. Note: Passing forward is illegal in sabre.
- Passata-sotto – An evasive action which is initiated by dropping a hand to the floor and lowering the body under the opponent's oncoming blade.
- Patinando – There are two types of patinandos, speed and tempo. They are advance lunges but with different tempos. The speed patinando is a fast step and a lunge, while the tempo patinando is a slow step (to get a slow response from one's opponent) and a fast lunge.
- Recovery – A return to en garde stance from any other position, generally by pulling backwards into en garde. Recovery from a lunge occurs by reversing the motions in a lunge, and recovering the extended arm last of all. A forward recovery involves moving the rear foot forward to return to en garde. For a center recovery, both feet move towards the center simultaneously.
- Reprise – From a lunge, a swift surprise attack made by performing a short forward recovery and an immediate second lunge. In terms of Right-of-way, a new action that follows an attack that missed or was parried. A redoublement takes place in a fencing tempo subsequent to that of the initial attack or riposte.
- Retreat – The basic backwards movement. Rear foot reaches backwards and is firmly planted, then front leg pushes body weight backwards smoothly into 'en garde' stance.

=== Blade Work ===
- Absence of blade – The situation in a bout when the opposing blades are not touching; opposite of engagement.
- Arrêt à bon temps – see Stop Hit.

==== Attacks ====
- Attack – The initial offensive action made by extending the sword arm and continuously threatening the valid target of the opponent.
  - Compound Attack – Also composed attack. An attack or riposte incorporating one or more feints to the opposite line that the action finishes in. A compound attack does not necessarily lose right of way during its execution; it just comprises more than one indirect action. Compound attacks are usually used to draw multiple reactions from an opponent, or against an opponent who uses complex parries. A counter-attack into a compound attack must hit a clear tempo ahead of the compound attack to be valid.
  - Coulé – Also graze, glisé, or glissade. An attack or feint that slides along the opponent's blade. In performing a sliding action along the opponent's blade, it is generally the goal to establish leverage by moving forte against foible, or forte to forte.
  - Counter-attack – An attack made against, or into, an attack initiated by the opponent. In foil and sabre, a counter-attack does not have the right-of-way against the opponent's initiated attack. Counter-attacking is a common tactic in épée, where one may gain a touch by hitting first, and avoiding the opponent's attack. Counter-attacks, especially in épée, are often accompanied by an action on the blade (beat, opposition, prise-de-fer, transfer).
    - Stop Cut – also Stop Thrust, Stop-in-Time. A counter-attack that attempts to take advantage of an uncertain attack. A properly performed Stop Hit allows a fencer to counter-attack into an oncoming attack, hit his opponent, and then still parry the oncoming attack (allowing a possible valid riposte as well). It may try to break the continuance of an attack by 'stopping' into it. However, it is still a Counter-attack, and does not have Right-of-Way against a continuous attack.
  - Counter-time – an attack that responds to the opponent's counter-attack, typically a riposte following the parry of the counter-attack.
  - Cut – An attack made with a chopping motion of the blade, landing with the edge. Cuts, that is, attempts to hit with the edge, are only valid in sabre.
    - Flick – A cut that lands with the point, often involving some whip of the foible of the blade to strike at a concealed target. In foil and épée, flick attacks often start out without the point directly threatening the target area, and comes in with a circular action, to allow the blade to bend at the end of the attack, placing the point on target, possibly by whipping past a parry.
    - Moulinet – In sabre, a circular cut. A moulinet is often composed of a parry, usually prime or seconde, moving thence into a circular cut. This action, while flashy and impressive, is slow, since the action pivots around the wrist and elbow, and is rarely used in modern sabre. In Historical Fencing, this is the circular motion of the fighter's blade around the opponent's blade. The hilt does not move during this maneuver.
  - Coupé – also Cut-Over. Another indirect attack, being an attack or deception that passes around the opponent's tip. Following a feint, the blade is pulled up and over the opponent's parrying blade. Use of the fingers and wrist ONLY is permitted, since moving the blade backwards at any time during this move invalidates the established right-of-way. Done in proper time, and with proper distance, the point may never be moved backwards, and the cut-over retain right-of-way during its entire execution.
  - Direct – an attack or riposte that finishes in the same line in which it was formed, with no feints out of that line. Most attacks that hit are done with straight attacks.
  - Double – an attack or riposte that describes a complete circle around the opponent's blade, and finishes in the opposite line. The full circle is done in reaction to the opponent's attempt to parry the attack or riposte with one or more parries, generally circular in nature. An attempt to perform a double' against an opponent who does NOT parry results in the attack running onto the opponent's blade, and parrying itself. A double' may be composed of simply a circular deception, which is effective against a defender's circular or semicircular parries, or it may be a combination of a disengage and cut-over, which is effective against two lateral parries.
  - Extension – The simplest action of attacking. A simple offensive action, consisting of extending the weapon arm forward. The point should move in the smoothest possible line towards the target, without wavering. Excess motion can ruin the control needed for precise, consistent hits.
  - False attack – an attack that is intended to miss or fall short, so as to produce a reaction from the opponent.
    - Feint – An offensive movement resembling an attack in all but its continuance. It is an attack into one line with the intention of switching to another line before the attack is completed. A feint is intended to draw a reaction from an opponent. This is the 'intention', and the reaction is generally a parry, which can then be deceived.
      - Disengage – A type of feint. Disengages are usually executed in conjunction with an extension/attack, though technically, they are just a deception around the opponent's blade. To use in an attack, feint an attack with an extension and avoid the opponent's attempt to parry or press your blade, using as small a circular motion as possible. Circle under the opponent's blade. The first extension must be a believable feint in order to draw a reaction. Be prepared to proceed forward with a straight attack if no parry response is forthcoming.
  - Indirect – An attack or riposte that finishes in a line different from that in which it was formed.
  - Insistence – Forcing an attack through the parry, using strength.
  - Remise – An immediate, direct replacement of an attack that missed, was short, or was parried, without withdrawing the arm. A remise is a direct continuation, meaning that no deceptions or changes of line occur with the continuation (replacement) of the attack. This may be done with a simple further extension of the arm, or may be accompanied with additional forward footwork (e.g. a reprise). In foil and sabre, a remise does not have right of way over a direct riposte.
  - Riposte – An attack with right-of-way following a valid parry. A simple (or direct) riposte goes straight from the parry position to the target. A riposte may attack in any line. Consider its equivalent in a conversation.
    - Compound-Riposte – A riposte made with one or more feints. A riposte may incorporate disengages, beats, and so on, as long as it is a continuous attack.
    - Counter-Riposte – A second, third, or further riposte in a fencing 'phrase' or encounter. A counter-riposte is the offensive action following the parry of any riposte.
  - Simple – An attack or riposte that involves no feints.
  - Redoublement – An indirect renewal of an attack that missed, was short, or was parried. This used to be defined as an attack after a return to en-garde, or a withdrawal of the arm after a failed attack. A reprise is now defined as a continued attack that uses an indirect action to reach the target. This indirect action may consist of a change of line, opposition, a withdrawal of the arm, or other action that does not immediately threaten the target. In foil and sabre, a reprise does not have right of way over a direct riposte.
  - Thrust – An attack made by moving the sword parallel to its length and landing with the point.
  - Trompement – The action of hitting an opponent at the end of a feint, after a successful deception.
  - Whip-over – In sabre, a touch that results from the foible of the blade whipping over the opponent's guard or blade when parried. Whip-overs are usually not counted, and used to be a way of saying that even though the blade hit, it was parried prior to body contact, and was not valid. However, with the advent of electric sabre, whip-overs are being allowed more often. The FIE has resolved this by introducing a new standard of stiffness for sabre blades (put into effect in 1999).

==== Engagement ====
- Engagement – During an encounter between two fencers, the point at which the fencers are close enough to join blades, or to make an effective attack. Blade contact is also referred to as an engagement, whether just standing there, during a parry, attack au fer, or prise de fer.
  - Conversation – The back-and-forth play of the blades in a fencing bout, composed of phrases (phrases d'armes) punctuated by gaps of no blade action.
    - Attaque au Fer – An attack on the opponent's blade, e.g. beat, expulsion, pressure.
    - Change of Engagement – An engagement of the opponent's blade in the opposite line. Changes of engagement are sometimes performed to place one fencers blade on the side of his/her opponent's blade that he feels has an advantage, or could be just to fool with the opponent. Often, a bout with a left-handed fencer versus a right-handed will see both of them jockey for position with changes of engagements.
    - Prise de Fer – (French : Literally take the steel); also "Taking the Blade"; an engagement of the blades that attempts to control the opponent's weapon. See also beat, press, expulsion, bind, croisé, envelopment, opposition, transfer.
      - Beat – A simple preparatory motion. A sharp controlled blow to the middle or 'weak' of the opponents blade, with the objective of provoking a reaction or creating an opening. The action should knock the opponent's blade aside or out of line. Your foible should contact the opponent's forte.
        - Counter-Beat – Also Change-Beat. A beat that is preceded by a circle under the opponent's blade. This can provoke a reaction with a beat from an unexpected quarter.
      - Bind – also Lie, Liement; An action in which one fencer forces the opponent's blade into the diagonally opposite line, (that is, from high line to low line on the opposite side, or vice versa) by taking it with the guard and forte of his own blade. See also Transfer.
      - Croisé – also Cross, semi-bind; an action in which one fencer forces the opponent's blade into the high or low line on the same side, by taking it with the guard and forte of his own blade. See also Transfer.
      - Envelopment – an action to seize the opponent's blade in one line and lead it (without losing contact) through a full circle to end in the same line. See also Transfer.
      - Glide – An attack or preparatory movement made by sliding down the opponent's blade, keeping it in constant contact.
      - Opposition – An action to seize the opponent's blade and control it progressively (moving along the blade) in the same line (of the opponent). An attack or counter-attack in the same line as the opponent's blade; a combined parry and riposte. This is, by definition, an offensive maneuver, since to 'progressively' control the opponent's blade you must move along its length, closing distance towards him. See also Transfer.
      - Press – also Pressure. An attempt to push the opponent's blade aside or out of line from engaged blades. A press can precede a direct or indirect attack, depending on the opponent's reaction, but should be followed by an immediate threat (a full or partial extension). A press which is not followed by a threat may invite a disengage from the opponent, and an attack thereby. From an engagement, press smoothly on the opponent's foible, taking his/her blade out of line, and perhaps provoking a response. The thumb and fingers should provide the force behind this action.
    - Derobement – An avoidance of an attempt to take the blade. A derobement is a reaction to the opponent's attempt to entrap, beat, press or take the blade, in a circular, lateral, vertical or diagonal motion.
    - Opposition – engagement in one line, and continuing the control with that same line. Also, moving the blade laterally, controlling with the same side of the blade, and the same line of the opponent's. e.g. quarte to sixte, septime to octave, and vice versa.
    - Preparation – Any action that precedes the actual launch of an attack. Preparation usually consists of actions against the opponents blade to take it out of line, or to provoke a reaction. In foil and sabre, any action that occurs during a phrase or conversation that precedes the establishment of right-of-way on the part of a fencer, often accompanied with a movement forward. In calling the actions in a foil or sabre bout, a referee may indicate preparation on the part of one fencer, meaning the fencer was moving forward without establishing right-of-way, and was vulnerable to an attack made during this time.
  - Point-in-Line – An established threat made with the extended arm. A point-in-line is a static threat, created by one fencer by extending the weapon and arm prior to any actions in a phrase. In foil and sabre, a Point-in-line has right of way, therefore, if the line is not withdrawn, any attack launched by the opponent does not have right of way. This can be likened to a spear poking up from the ground: If you throw yourself upon it, you have only yourself to blame. A successful attack on the blade will invalidate a point-in-line or causing the opponent to withdraw his/her arm. In épée, Point-in-line has no right of way advantages, but is still an effective tactic.
- Coup d'arrêt – see Stop-Hit.
- Invitation – A line that is intentionally left open to encourage the opponent to attack.
- Presentation – Offering one's blade for engagement by the opponent.
- Posting – A method of holding a weapon further down the handle in order to extend the reach by a few inches. Posting is a trade-off; the fencer loses a little control over their blade work in return for the longer reach. This is most commonly done using a french grip épée, where there is no need to establish right of way, and hitting first can result in being awarded the touch. Technically, it is not legal to slide one's hand on the grip from front to back during an action (see USFA t.16), so a fencer who wishes to post must do it while the action is stopped, or risk a possible penalty.
- Salute – A blade action performed before a bout or lesson. Indicates respect and good sportsmanship. A handshake is usually exchanged after a bout.
- Touché (French pronunciation: [tuʃe]) – the French word for "touched" is used to acknowledge a hit, called out by the fencer who is hit. Conversely, if a fencer concedes a hit when no hit was actually made, the fencer's adversary would say, "'pas de touché'" (French pronunciation: [pɑ də tuʃe]; English: no touch) to indicate that the hit should not be counted.

==== Parrying techniques ====
- Line – The main direction of an attack (e.g., high/low, inside/outside), often equated to the parry that must be made to deflect the attack; see also point in line.
- Lines – The means of referring to a position or area on a fencer's body. The idea behind 'lines' is that the torso, as facing the viewer in 'en garde', is bisected both laterally and vertically. There are then four quadrants of the body. The quadrants which are above the lateral line are referred to as 'high line,' those below as 'low line.' The fencer's left-hand-side, referred to as chest, is the inside. The fencer's right-hand-side, referred to as flank, is the outside. The lower chest side quadrant is then referred to as 'inside low line.'

The common parries in foil and epée are: sixte (outside-high), quarte (inside-high), octave (outside-low), and septieme (inside-low). Angled (up-and-down) parries can also be used. In sabre, tierce replaces sixte to guard the inside-high line, quarte becomes more erect, seconde replaces octave on the inside-low line, and prime replaces septieme. Quinte is used in sabre to protect the head.

- Parry – A simple defensive action designed to deflect an attack, performed with the forte of the blade. A parry is usually only wide enough to allow the attacker's blade to just miss; any additional motion is wasteful. A well-executed parry should take the foible of the attacker's blade with the forte and/or guard of the defender's. This provides the greatest control over the opponent's blade. In sabre, the guard should be turned appropriately using the fingers to protect the wrist.

Parries generally cover one of the 'lines' of the body. The simplest parries move the blade in a straight line. Other parries move the blade in a circular, semicircular, or diagonal manner. There are eight basic parries, and many derivatives of these eight. (see Prime, Seconde, Tierce, Quarte, Quinte, Sixte, Septime, Octave, Neuvieme). See also Lines.
In foil, the opponent's blade should not only be deflected away from the target, but away from off-target areas as well. An attack that is deflected off the valid target but onto invalid target still retains right-of-way. In sabre, the opponent's blade need only be deflected away from valid target, since off-target touches do not stop the phrase. Sabre parries must be particularly clean and clear to avoid the possibility of whip-over touches. In épée, a good parry is simply any one that gains enough time for the riposte; opposition parries and prise-de-fer are commonly used, since they do not release the opponent's blade to allow a remise.

  - Beat Parry – deflecting the incoming attack with a sharp striking motion.
  - Counter-Parry – also circular parry. A parry that moves in a circle to end up in the same position in which it started. A counter-parry usually traps an attack coming in a different line, but in the same high/low line. Thus, Parry Counter-Six (circular outside hide) is effective against attacks in the Four line (inside high).
  - Opposition Parry – deflecting the incoming attack without ever losing contact with the blade from the initial engagement.
  - Ordinal parries
    - Prime – Parry #1; blade down and to the inside, wrist pronated. The point is significantly lower than the hand. Covers the inside low-line (this is a rare sabre parry).
    - Seconde – Parry #2; blade down and to the outside, wrist pronated. The point is significantly lower than the hand. Covers the outside low line in sabre, replacing octave.
    - Tierce – Parry #3; blade up and to the outside, wrist pronated. The point is significantly higher than the hand. Covers the outside high line. This is the basic en garde position in sabre. Then retreat toward original position.
    - Quarte – Parry #4; blade up and to the inside, wrist supinated. The point is higher than the hand. Covers the inside high line.
    - Quinte – Parry #5; blade up and to the inside, wrist pronated. The point is higher than the hand. This parry, more than any other, is subject to different interpretations in different schools (in foil and épée). In foil and épée, this parry generally covers the inside high line, since the pronated wrist can push further down that the supinated wrist (in Quarte). If the point and hand are lifted, this parry can also cover the inside low line with a sweeping action upwards, carrying the opponents point over the outside shoulder. In sabre, the blade is held above the head to protect from head cuts, but should still point slightly forward ready for riposte.
    - Sixte – Parry #6; blade up and to the outside, wrist supinated. The point is higher than the hand. Covers the outside high line. This is generally the parry taught as the basic en garde position in foil and épée.
    - Septime – Parry #7; blade down and to the inside, wrist supinated. The point is lower than the hand. Covers the inside low line.
    - Octave – Parry #8; blade down and to the outside, wrist supinated. The point is lower than the hand. Covers the outside low line.
    - Neuvieme – Parry #9; blade behind the back, pointing down; alternatively, similar to elevated sixte. Originally used in sabre, to defend the back against a passing or overtaking opponent. Covers the outside line on the back.
  - Semicircular Parry – A parry that moves from a high line to a low line, or vice versa. The parry can also cross the body. The parry must be made in a semicircle to provide the enveloping movement needed to trap the attacking blade.
  - Yielding Parry – deflecting the incoming attack by maintaining contact with the blade and changing the point of contact between the blades, moving from a position of poor leverage to one using the forte for strong leverage.
- Pronation – The position of the hand when the palm is facing down. See supination.
- Supination – The position of the hand when the palm is facing up. See Pronation.

==== Other maneuvers ====
- Counter-Attack – An attack into an established attack (that already has right-of-way). In foil and sabre, a counter-attack does NOT have the right-of-way, and will not gain a touch if the opposing fencer's attack lands. Breaking the arm in the middle of a perfectly good attack can turn your attack into a counter-attack without right-of-way.
- Displacement – Moving the target to avoid an attack; dodging.
- In-fighting – Fencing at closed distance, where the distance between the two fencers is such that the weapon must be withdrawn before the point can threaten or hit the target.
- Inside – The direction to the front of the body. (The left for a right-hander.)
- Opposition – An attack that is made fully in contact with the opponent's blade. The purpose is to control the opponent's blade from the starting point (usually a parry) throughout the attack. This is often used as a counter-offensive technique, especially in épée, but can be a problem if a disengagement is made by the opponent. Also Lateral Transfer.
- Outside – The direction away from the front of the body. (The right for a right-hander.)
- Passé – An attack that passes the target without hitting.
- Point-in-Line – An extended arm and blade that threatens the opponent, which is established before any other valid attack from the opponent. For instance, from outside of engagement distance, a fencer performs an extension, establishing right-of-way. Until this extension is broken, it maintains right-of-way. Any direct attack made against it (without a beat, or other similar action) will be considered a counter-attack.
- Preparation – The initial phase of an attack, before right-of-way is established.
- Priority – In sabre, the now-superseded rules that decide which fencer will be awarded the touch in the event that they both attack simultaneously; also used synonymously with right-of-way. In the 1995 revision of the rules for all weapons, priority is also awarded when time expires with a tied score. The priority is determined by the flip of a coin at the start of the last minute, and the winner of the toss wins the bout if the score is tied when time expires.
- Redoublement – A new action that follows an attack that missed or was parried. This is distinguished from a remise, reprise, or riposte by being a NEW action. See also redoublement under Footwork.
- Remise – An immediate, direct replacement of an attack that missed, was short, or was parried, without withdrawing the arm. This is a continuation of an attack, and does not have priority (in foil and sabre) over a direct riposte.
- Reprise – An indirect renewal of an attack that missed or was parried. This is a continuation of an attack, and does not have priority (in foil and sabre) over a direct riposte.
- Right-of-Way – The rules for awarding the point in the event of a double touch in foil or sabre. The concept involved in being the first to establish a valid threat to an opponent's target area. Extending is the usual means to establishing this threat. Breaking the extended arm during an attack means relinquishing right-of-way. An opponent can take right-of-way by parrying the opponents blade.
- Riposte – An attack made immediately after a parry of the opponent's attack.
- Salle – (French: "room") A fencing hall or club.
- Second-Intention – In general, a term used to imply that the first action initiated is NOT the one intended to score. The fencer may initiate a move, anticipating (or intending to draw) a certain response from the opponent, against which a second action is planned. For example, Lunge Attack (anticipating that it will be parried), Parry the riposte, and Redouble with a Counter-Riposte.
- Simple – An attack or riposte that involves no feints.
- Simultaneous – In foil and sabre, two attacks for which the right-of-way is too close to determine.
- Target Area – The area delimited for valid hits in that weapon. Foil target area consists of the entire torso, including the groin and the bottom of the mask which covers the lame, and down to the waist in back. Head, arms and legs are considered off-target in foil. Épée uses the entire body for target. Sabre uses all the body area above the waist, except the hands and the back of the head.

== Fencing organizations ==
- Intercollegiate Fencing Association
- List of NCAA fencing schools
- United States Fencing Association
- United States Fencing Hall of Fame
- American Fencing League
- British Fencing Association
- Intercollegiate Fencing Association
- National Intercollegiate Women's Fencing Association
- European Fencing Confederation
- Irish Fencing Federation
- Turkish Fencing Federation

=== Fencing clubs ===
- List of University Fencing Clubs
- UCD Fencing Club
- University of Tennessee Fencing Club
- USC Fencing Club
- VRI Fencing Club
- Bangor University Fencing Club
- Dubai Fencing Club
- Ottawa Fencing Club
- Northampton Fencing Club
- OPS Fencing Club
- Sheffield Buccaneers Fencing Club

== Fencing competitions ==
- Commonwealth Fencing Championships
- Commonwealth Junior Fencing Championships
- Commonwealth Veteran Fencing Championships
- European Fencing Championships
- Fencing at the Summer Olympics
- Fencing World Cup
- NCAA fencing individual championship
- NCAA Fencing team championship
- UAAP Fencing Championship
- World Fencing Championships
  - 1937 • 1938 • 1947 • 1948 • 1949 • 1950 • 1951 • 1952 • 1953 • 1954 • 1955 • 1956 • 1957 • 1958 • 1959 • 1961 • 1962 • 1963 • 1965 • 1966 • 1967 • 1969 • 1970 • 1971 • 1973 • 1974 • 1975 • 1977 • 1978 • 1979 • 1981 • 1982 • 1983 • 1985 • 1986 • 1987 • 1988 • 1989 • 1990 • 1991 • 1993 • 1994 • 1995 • 1997 • 1998 • 1999 • 2000 • 2001 • 2002 • 2003 • 2004 • 2005 • 2006 • 2007 • 2008 • 2009 • 2010 • 2011

== Fencing publications ==
- The Sword

=== Fiction ===
- The Fencing Master

== Persons influential in fencing ==
- List of American epee fencers
- List of American foil fencers
- List of American sabreurs
- List of Maccabiah medalists in fencing (men)
- List of notable fencers
- List of Olympic medalists in fencing (men)
- List of Olympic medalists in fencing (women)
- USFA Hall of Fame

== Other forms of fencing ==
- Stage fencing –
- Academic fencing (mensur) –
- Classical fencing –
- SCA fencing –
- Swordsmanship –
- Wheelchair fencing

== See also ==
- Glossary of fencing
- Outline of sports
- Historical European martial arts
