= Sport in Sheffield =

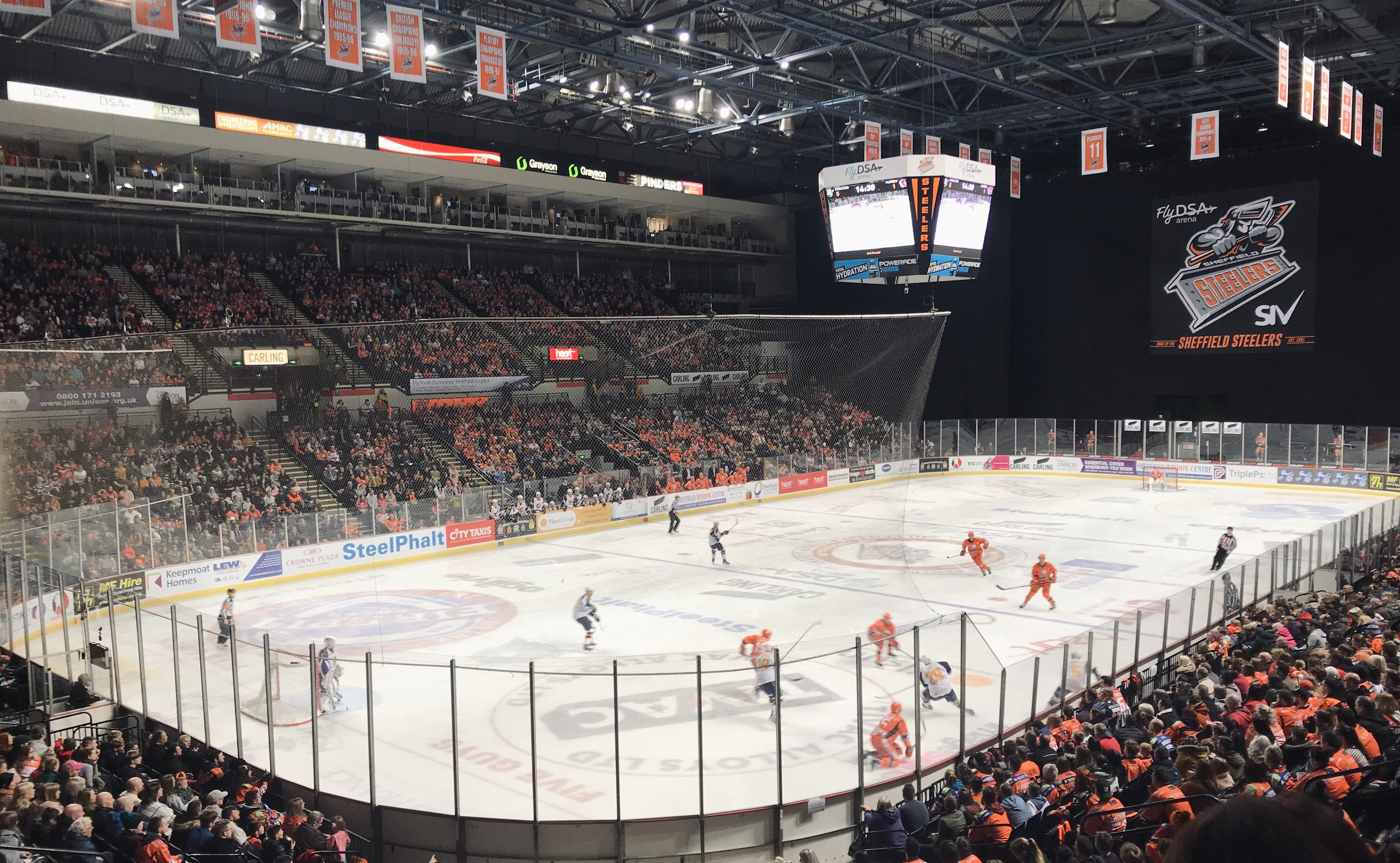
Ice Hockey at Sheffield Arena

Sheffield has a long history of involvement in sport. Although cricket was the first organised sport, it has gradually been supplanted by football. Both the main two local football teams grew out of cricket teams. Sheffield can claim many firsts in football the most famous one being Sheffield F.C. being the world's first and oldest football club. Today it has a club in every major team sport in England. Sheffield became the first UK National City of Sport in 1995 and is now home to the English Institute of Sport (EIS).

Today the city is home to two league clubs Sheffield Wednesday and Sheffield United, top flight ice hockey (Sheffield Steelers) and basketball (Sheffield Sharks) and a Premier League speedway team (Sheffield Tigers). Sheffield Eagles is the main rugby league club and operates a level below the Super League.

There have been six boxing world champions from Sheffield, including the likes of Clinton Woods and Johnny Nelson. David Sherwood is a top ten British tennis player from the city and the former England cricket captain, Michael Vaughan, was brought up and lives in Sheffield. Joe Simpson, a famous climber also comes from the city.

The largest stadium is Hillsborough Stadium, the home of Sheffield Wednesday, which holds around 39,850. The now-demolished Don Valley Stadium was formerly the largest athletics stadium in the United Kingdom. Bramall Lane is the world's oldest major football ground and holds around 33,000 and Sandygate Road, home to Hallam F.C., is the oldest football ground. The World Snooker Championships has been held at the Crucible Theatre since 1977.

== History ==
=== Early sport ===
The earliest reference to cricket involving Sheffield was a match between Sheffield and Nottingham in 1771. The first recorded game of football in Sheffield was played in 1793 between Sheffield and Norton (a village in Derbyshire at the time but now a suburb of Sheffield). The game initially started as six a side but numbers swelled after both sides called for reinforcements. It continued for 3 days after which it descended into a general row.

Hallam Cricket Club was formed in 1804 and started using land in Sandygate as their ground. It continues to be used to this day and is acknowledged as the oldest ground in the world. Sheffield Wednesday Cricket Club was formed in 1820. The first cricket match between Yorkshire and Lancashire took place at Hyde Park in 1949.

=== Birth of Football ===
By the 1850s the city had several cricket clubs, the matches mainly being played during the summer. Nathaniel Creswick and William Prest wanted to start a team that could keep the players together during the winter and formed Sheffield F.C. in 1857. In 1857 they decided to write the first rule book for football called Sheffield Rules and the first laws of Sheffield Football Club were approved in 1858. By 1860 there were 15 football clubs in the city.

Sheffield United Cricket Club was formed in 1854, so called because it was made up of the uniting of several local sides. It was the first club to be named United. The Bramall Lane ground was built a year later. Yorkshire County Cricket Club was also formed in the city in 1863.

The teams continued to play under the Sheffield Rules after the formation of the FA known locally as the London FA. They formed their own association in 1867 and played the first ever competitive football competition, the Youdan Cup, in the same year. Another significant event was the formation of Sheffield Wednesday football club.

The first inter-association football match between Sheffield FA and London (the FA) was played at Bramall lane. Sheffield won the match 3–1. Many such matches were played during the 1870s with the home side dictating which rules they should play under. This eventually led to a merger of the two set of rules in 1878.

=== Decline of cricket, rise of football ===
Sheffield's rich history of football clubs started in the 1860s where over 170 clubs were founded between 1857 and 1875. Below shows a table of the currently known football clubs that were founded in Sheffield during this time.

Club Name	Year Founded	Where they played
Sheffield FC	1857	played at East Bank
Hallam FC	1860	play at Sandygate
Norfolk FC	1861	played at Norfolk Park
Cemetery Road Church FC		Oldest church club, played at Hunters Bar
York FC	1861	From York Hotel, Broomhill, played at Endcliffe Cricket Ground, N Creswick was President
Norton FC	1861	played at Oaks Park, Norton
Pitsmoor FC	1861	played at Pitsmoor CC, now SUFC Academy
Fir Vale FC	1862	played at Pitsmoor CC, now SUFC Academy
Heeley Christ Church FC	1862	played at Meersbrook Park
Mackenzie FC	1862	played at Myrtle Road, Heeley
Milton FC		played at Cremorne Gardens, London Road
Howard Hill Steel Bank FC	1862	Met in Howard Hotel, Howard Road
Ranmoor FC	1862	played in Ranmoor
St George FC	1862	From St George's Church, Broad Lane.
St Stephen FC	1862	From St Stephen's Church Fawcett Road, Netherthorpe. Played at Crookes.
United Norfolk FC	1862	Origins uncertain
Crabtree FC	1863	Likely from Fir Vale area
Broomhall FC	1863	played at Ecclesall Road
Hemesworth FC	1863	From Hemesworth
United Mechanics	1865	played at Norfolk Park
Garrick FC	1866	played at East Bank
Wellington FC	1866	played at Hounsfield Park near Bramall Lane
Loxley FC	1866	Met at The Rodney Inn, Loxley
Wednesday FC	1867	played at Highfields, now Hillsborough
Exchange FC	1867	played at Hallam's Farm, now Hyde Park Flats
Dore FC	1867	Met at The Devonshire Arms, Dore
Tapton FC	1867	Based at Tapton Hall
Dronfield FC	1868	played at Bagley's Field, Dronfield
Brincliffe FC	1868	played at Cherry Tree Farm, near Union pub
Hanover United FC	1868	played at Crookes
Stannington FC	1868	unknown ground location
Redhill FC	1868	played at Winter Street, near Weston Park
Engineers FC	1868	played at Endcliffe Crescent
Artillery & Hallamshire FC (later just Artillery)	1868	Based at Endcliffe Hall
Parkwood Springs FC	1869	played at Parkwood Springs Recreation Ground
Oxford FC	1869	played at Ecclesall Road
Totley FC	1869	played at field next to Cross Scythes Inn, Totley
St Vincent's	1869	from Solly Street – played at Queens Ground. Oldest Catholic Church club
St James Church FC	1869	played at Norton Lees Lane
Norton United FC	1869	From Norton
Sheffield Norfolk	1869	Played at Norfolk Park
Lockwood Brothers FC	1870	played at Hunters Bar, oldest factory works club
Talbot FC	1870	played at Norfolk Road
Surrey Catholic Club	1870	played at The Farm, now Sheffield College
Attercliffe (Christ Church)	1870	played at The Old Forge Ground, Shirland Lane
Walkey New Connexion FC	1870	played at Queens Ground, Hillsborough
Crookes FC	1870	played at Lydgate Lane
Bankers / Thursday	1870	played at Hunters Bar
Wanderers FC	Unknown	Unknown
Alliance FC	1870	played at Norfolk Park
Perseverance FC	1870	played at Norfolk Park
Gleadless FC	1870	played at Charnock Hall, Gleadless
Sheffield United	1870	Unknown origins
Gymnastic Club	Unknown	Unknown
Ecclesall College FC	1870	From Ecclesall College
Sheffield Grammar	1870	From Sheffield Grammar School School FC
Attercliffe Zion FC	1871	Zion Church, Attercliffe
Grimesthorpe FC	1871	Met at Victoria Hotel. From Grimesthorpe
Exchange Brewery FC	1871	played at Fox Street, Pye Bank
All Saints Night School FC	1871	Hall Carr Lane, now Carwood Road
Millhouses FC	1871	possibly played at The Old Corn Mill
Albion FC	1872	played at Ecclesall Road
Pye Bank FC	1872	played at Fox Street, Pye Bank
Brightside FC	1872	played at Blackburn Meadows, Blackburn
Norfolk Works FC	1872	Played at Newhall Athletic Ground
Eldon St Jude's FC	1872	played at Brocco Bank
Garden Street FC	1872	From Garden Street, Hollins Croft
Sharrow Rangers FC	1873	played at Crescent Road, Sharrow
Endcliffe FC	1873	played at Ecclesall Road
Owlerton FC	1873	played at Rawson's Meadow Ground, Owlerton
Ecclesfield FC	1873	played at Fairham's Croft
Philadelphia FC	1873	played at Queens Ground Hillsborough
Intake FC	1873	From Intake
Cherrytree FC	1873	Possibly from Cherrytree Orphanage
Victoria (Burngreave) FC	1873	played at Hall Carr Lane, east end
West End FC	1873	played at Hunters Bar, from West End Hotel
Bury's & Co FC	1873	From Regents Works, now Wicks
Beadshaw's (Baltic) FC	1873	From Baltic Works, Attercliffe
Oughtibridge FC	1873	From Oughtibridge
Weston FC	1873	Possibly played at Weston Hall
Wardsend Steel Works FC	1873	From Wardsend Steel Works, Herries Road
Owlerton Reform FC	1873	From Wesleyan Reform Church on Borough Road, Owlerton
Roebuck FC	1873	Roebuck pub, played at East Bank
Tennant Brothers & Co FC	1873	2 nd club from Exchange Brewery
Crosspool Rangers FC	1873	From Crosspool
Clifford FC	1873	From Clifford House, Psalter Lane
Grange FC	1873	played at Intake Road
Pitsmoor Coal Company FC	1873	From Brightside
Boston Street FC	1873	From Boston Street, played in Heeley
Birley FC	1873	played at Hollinsend, Birley
Sherrington FC	1873	From Sherrington Road, Sharrow, played Norfolk Park
105 th Regiment	1874	Joined FA in 1874. Played in FA Cup 1875 to 1879.Nickname was ‘Light Bobs’
Carnforth FC	1874	played at Sharrow Vale Road
Providence FC	1874	played at Park Hill Lane
Handsworth FC	1874	Ground unknown
Woodseats FC	1874	Met at the Woodseats Hotel, now Viraaj
Oak Street FC	1874	From street of same name, Heeley
Atlas FC	1874	formed from Atlas Works, East End
Ecclesall FC	1874	played at Hunters Bar
Nether FC	1874	played at Eastborne
Broomfield FC	1874	From Broomfield area of Sheffield
St Mark's FC	1874	From St Mark's Broomfield Road
Tabernacle FC	1874	From Tabernacle Church, Albert Terrace Road
St Michaels Angels FC	1874	From St Michael's Church, Parkwood Springs
Kenwood FC	1874	played at a ground off Abbeydale Road
Port Mahon FC	1874	From Port Mahon, now Ponderosa
St Luke's FC	1874	From St Luke's, Park (behind Midland Station), played at King's Head ground, Tapton
Heeley Victoria FC	1874	From Victoria Hotel in Heeley
Shrewsbury Road FC	1874	Road of same name behind Midland station
Park United FC	1874	From Park area
White Star FC	1874	Location origins unknown
Good Intent FC	1874	Likely played at Truro Ground on Matilda Street
Mount Tabor FC	1874	Church in city centre, now demolished
St Jude's FC	1874	From St Jude's church on Cupola Street
Wingfield & Rowbotham FC	1874	From their works on Tenter Street
Young Broomhall FC	1874	Ground location unknown
Regents Works FC	1874	Regents Works, now Wicks on Penistone Road
L. O. Good Templars FC (later Templars)	1874	Ground location unknown
Brookes & Crookes FC	1874	From Brook Steel Works, Brook Lane
Polar Star FC	1874	played at Norfolk Park
Norton Mount View FC	1874	From Mount View Methodists Church, Norton Lees
Mill Sands FC	1874	From Mill Sands Works, now Vulcan House
Fenton Brothers FC	1874	From their works, East Street, Park
Sir John Brown's FC	1874	played at Osgathorpe, near Earl Marshall
St Silas FC	1874	From St Silas Church, Broomhall
Ecclesall Church FC	1874	From Ecclesall All Saints
Firth's FC	1874	From Thomas Firth & Son's, east end
Owlerton United FC	1874	played at Wadsley Bridge
Atkin Brothers FC	1874	From Truro Works, Matilda Street
Unitarian FC	1874	From Unitarian Church, Norfolk Street
Deep Pits FC	1874	Near Manor Top, on City Road
Sheaf FC	1874	From Sheaf Works next to Victoria station
Tinsley FC	1874	From Tinsley
Montague FC	1874	From Montague Street Sharrow
Stag Home FC	1875	Origins uncertain, possibly played at Kenwood
Stanley Street FC	1875	From Stanley Street, Wicker, played mainly at Norfolk Park
Langsett Road FC	1875	Likely played at Queens Ground
Manor FC	1875	played at Manor Lane
Wheatman & Smith's FC	1875	From Russell Works, near Kelham Island
Netherthorpe FC	1875	Ground location uncertain
St Peter's FC	1875	From the now Cathedral, played at Myrtle Road
St Philip's FC	1875	From St Philip's church, Netherthorpe
Dronfield United FC	1875	From Dronfield
Hope Club	1875	From Hope Works on Sussex Road, Played at Weston Field
Brown Bailey & Dixon FC	1875	From their Attercliffe works, Leeds Road
Ward & Payne's FC	1875	From their Limbrick Works, Hillsborough
Crookes United FC	1875	Likely played at Lydgate Lane
Harold FC	1875	Likely from Harold Street, Walkley
Hutton & Son FC	1875	From Hutton's Works, West Street
Malinda Works FC	1875	From Malinda Works, Malinda Street
Parkwood Juniors FC	1875	From Parkwood Springs
Aston FC	1875	From Aston
Washington FC	1875	From Wostenholm's Washington Works, Washington Street, poss played at Cobden View
St Paul's FC	1875	From St Paul's church, now Peace Gardens
South View FC	1875	From South View Road in Sharrow, played at Machon Bank
Ecclesall United FC	1875	played at Ecclesall
MS&L Loco FC	1875	Ground location unknown
Oxford Wanderers FC	1875	Poss from Oxford Street, played Norfolk Park
Dronfield Free Church FC	1875	From Dronfield United Methodist Free Church, now Peel Centre, High Street, Dronfield
Atlantic (Juniors) FC	1875	played at Cobden View
Wincobank FC	1875	From Wincobank area
Alexandra FC	1875	From Alexandra Road, Heeley
Carbrook United FC	1875	played behind St Batholowmew's Church Carbrook
R Sorby & Son FC	1875	From Kangaroo Works, Trafalgar Street
Upperthorpe FC	1875	played at Cobden View
Howard Street FC	1875	Likely played in Heeley, from Howard Street
Otley & Son's FC	1875	From Meadow Works Shalesmoor
Hillsborough School FC	1875	played at Hillsborough
Bellefield FC	1875	From Bellefield Works, Bellefield Lane, Netherthorpe
Red Rose FC	1875	Could be from Pitsmoor or Bramall Lane or was possibly 2 clubs
Weston Rovers FC	1875	Uncertain origins
J Round & Son FC	1875	From Tudor Works, Tudor Street, now Tudor Suare
Dronfield Baptists FC	1875	From Dronfield Baptist Church, Stubley Lane
Pye Bank Free Church FC	1875	Pye Bank, Sheffield
Dronfield Independent FC	1875	From Independent Chapel Lea Road, Dronfield
Ebernezer Reform FC	1875	Ebernezer Chaple, Neepsend
Kenyon's Works FC	1875	From Kenyon Works, Hollins Croft
Clough House FC	1875	Likely from The Clough area near Bramall Lane
Trinity FC	1875	From George Butler & Co, Trinity Works
Wostenholm FC	1875	2 nd club from Washington Works
Bee Hive Works FC	1875	From Bee Hive Works Neepsend (not Milton St)
Chester Brothers FC	1875	From West End Cuterly Works West Street
Heeley United FC	1875	Unknown origins
Cornish Place FC	1875	From Cornish Works, Neepsend
Minerva FC	1875	From their works on John Street
Woodhouse FC	1875	From Woodhouse

Sheffield United F.C. were formed in 1889. In the same year Sheffield Wednesday turned professional and applied for membership of the Football League. This was denied so they became founding members of the Football Alliance and won its competition in the first season. Both the clubs were accepted into the Football League in 1892. Wednesday into division 1 and United into the newly formed second division.

At the turn of the century the city enjoyed huge success starting with Sheffield Wednesday winning the FA Cup in 1896. United then won the league in 1898, the FA Cup the following year, and again in 1902. Wednesday then won the league twice in a row in 1903/4 and 1904/5. Sheffield F.C. also won their first cup, the FA Amateur Cup, in 1904.

Meanwhile, cricket in the city was in decline. Yorkshire CCC moved its headquarters to Headingley, Leeds in 1893. Although Bramall Lane hosted its first test match in 1912, the experiment was seen as a disaster and was never repeated. England lost to Australia, which was blamed on poor light conditions caused by the heavy air pollution which used to plague the city. Sheffield Wednesday cricket club ceased to exist in 1925 due to a lack of players.

The following decades saw intermittent success for both clubs, including another brace of league titles for Wednesday in 1928–1930. The last FA Cup win for a Sheffield club was in 1935 by Wednesday.

=== Post war years ===
Both clubs then went into decline after the Second World War. Wednesday sank to the third division in 1974 and United were relegated as far as the fourth division by 1981. Cricket matches, at a national level, ceased altogether in the city 1973 when the last county match was played at Bramall Lane.

In 1989, Sheffield Wednesday's home ground of Hillsborough was the scene of a tragedy when 96 Liverpool fans were crushed to death during an FA Cup semifinal in the infamous Hillsborough disaster. This prompted a series of safety improvements at football grounds around the country, with terraced stands converted to all seated accommodation.

The early 1990s saw an upsurge in the fortunes of both clubs starting with Wednesday winning the League Cup in 1991. The two teams then met in the FA Cup semi-final in 1993. Wednesday won the match 2–1 but went on to lose both the final and League Cup final, both to Arsenal, during which season the Owls visited Wembley four times. Both teams, however, began to lose fortune as the decade progressed and were both relegated from the top fight; United in 1994, and Wednesday in 2000. The Blades hovered in the second tier for more than 10 years, until they briefly re-entered the Premier League for the 2006–07 season, but were relegated straight back down after an unsuccessful campaign accumulating only 38 points.

Wednesday's performance in the first decade of the 21st century has been arguably the worst in the club's history; following relegation from the Premier League in 2000 they were further relegated to the third tier in 2003. The Owls came back to the Championship in 2005 via the League One Play-offs, but after a five-season spell in the Championship, the club again found themselves back down in the third tier for the 2010–11 season.

United were also relegated to League One in time for the 2011–12 season, a season in which both clubs contested to get out of the division, with Wednesday being victorious in the end finishing in second place to return to the Championship. United contested numerous play-offs until in 2017, when they were promoted to the Championship under manager and fan, Chris Wilder - winning League One with 100 points won. United were then promoted once more under Wilder in 2019, coming runners up in the Championship. The Blades finished 9th in the top flight in 2019/20. Sheffield Wednesday continue to compete in the second tier.

Sheffield was briefly home to a third Football League club from 2008 to 2012 when Rotherham United played their home matches at Don Valley Stadium, following a dispute with the owner of their Millmoor ground. Rotherham moved back to their hometown in 2012 following the completion of the New York Stadium

== Basketball ==
Sheffield Sharks are a professional basketball team who play at English Institute of Sport. They were formed in 1994 and won the British Basketball League in their first season. They have won it a total of 3 times. The City of Sheffield Arrows play in the English Basketball League, as do the Sheffield Sabres and the Sheffield Saints. The Arrows and the Sabres play home games at the English Institute of Sport whereas the Saints play at All Saints School. Sheffield Hatters are a women's basketball team who also play at All Saints. They have dominated the National League winning it every year from 1991 to 2002. However, other teams have caught up in recent years. Both Sheffield University and Sheffield Hallam University have basketball teams and SHU has produced many good BUCS (British Universities and College Sports) basketball teams over the years reaching the national finals several times. Many SHU players have gone on to play on in other high-level basketball leagues around the country.

== Boxing ==
Sheffield has enjoyed huge success in boxing mainly due to the Wincobank gym run by Brendan Ingle. During the 1990s several world champions were produced including Naseem Hamed, Herol Graham, Johnny Nelson and Paul Jones. Sheffield continued to produce world champions in the 2000s with the likes of Clinton Woods, Junior Witter, and Kell Brook.

== Cricket ==
Sheffield still has a number of local cricket teams, including Sheffield United Cricket Club, Shiregreen Cricket Club, Hallam Cricket Club and Sheffield Collegiate CC. Most of which play in the South Yorkshire Cricket League.

== Football ==
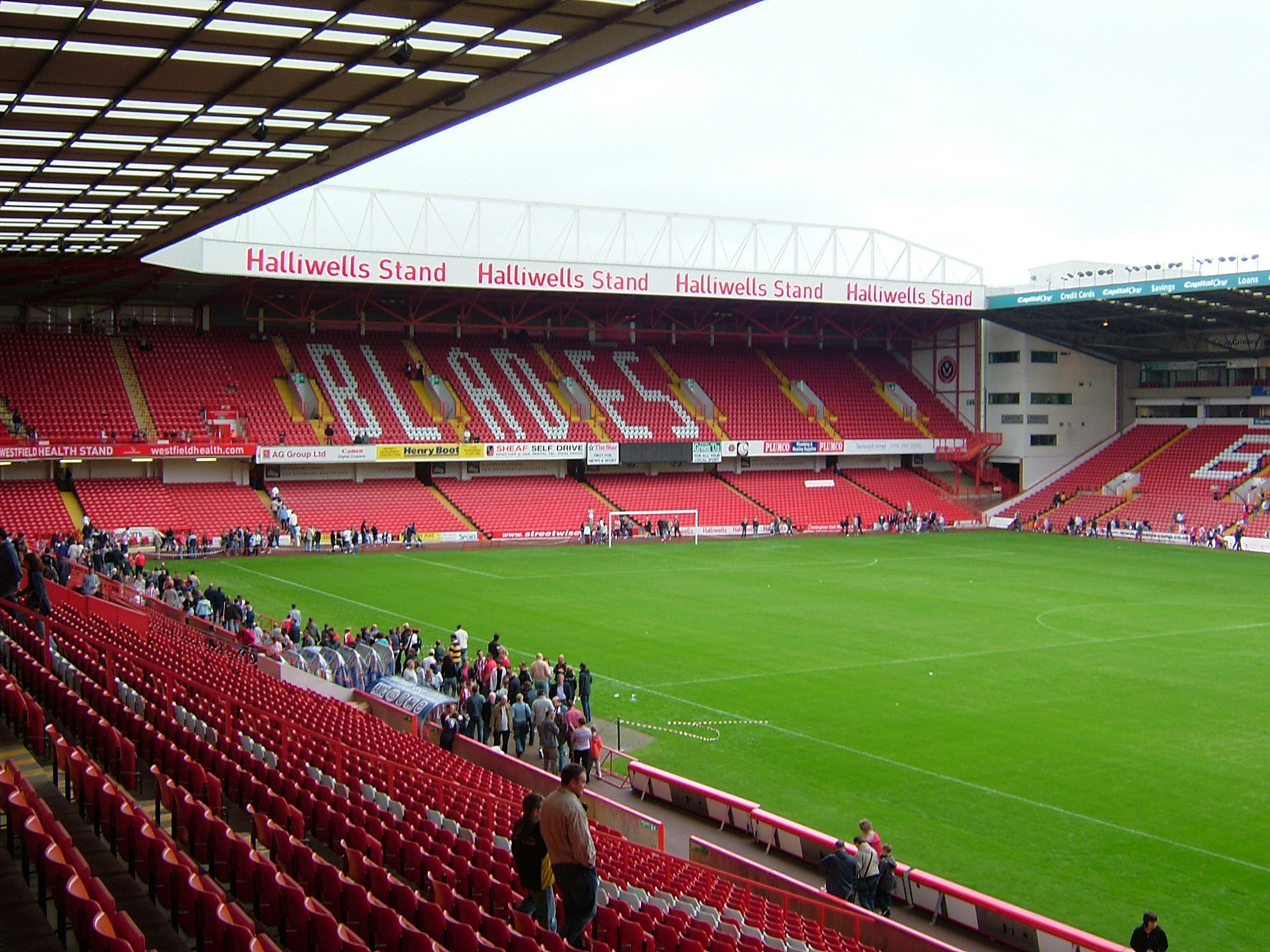
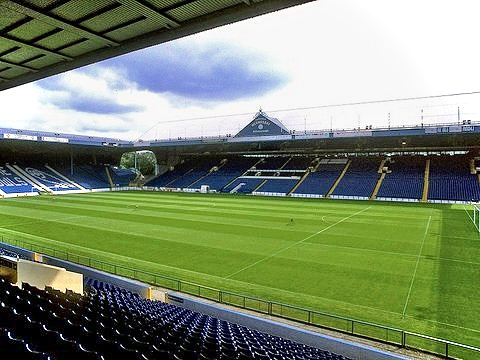
Bramall Lane (top) of United and the Hillsborough Stadium (bottom) of The Wednesdays

There are two derbies played in the city. Sheffield United and Wednesday contest the Steel City Derby in the league or sometimes as a pre-season friendly if they are not in the same division. The last team to win a 'Steel City Derby' was Sheffield United in the 2024–25 season, with Rhian Brewster scoring the winner in the 61st minute. Hallam F.C. and Sheffield F.C. still play the world's oldest derby. They are currently both in the Northern Counties East League Premier Division. Sheffield Wednesday have entered administration as of 24 October 2025.

=== Existing Clubs ===
- Hallam F.C.
- Handsworth F.C.
- Sheffield F.C.
- Sheffield United F.C.
- Sheffield Wednesday F.C.
- Stocksbridge Park Steels F.C.

== Ice hockey ==
Sheffield Steelers are an ice hockey team who play their home matches at Sheffield Arena. They were formed in 1991 and rapidly rose up the leagues to the British Hockey League Premier Division which folded at the end of 1995–96 season. Next was the Superleague (ISL) which formed in the 1996–97 season folding at the end of 2002-03 season. And finally the Elite Ice Hockey League (EIHL) founded at the start of 2003–04 season the league still exists now. They won the championship (playoffs) in their second season and again in their third. In total, they have won the league title 10 times, the British playoffs 11 times, and the challenge cup tournament 6 times, amongst other trophies. They are arguably one of the most successful ice hockey teams in the UK. The Steelers have competed in the Champions Hockey League three times (2015-16, 2016-17 and 2024–25), a tournament in which the best European teams qualify to compete in. In the Elite Ice Hockey League regular season champions qualify.

The city also has several other ice hockey teams (in fact, Sheffield has more senior-level ice hockey teams than any other UK city). The Sheffield Steeldogs (owned by the Steelers) play in the second-tier National Ice hockey League and the Sheffield Senators and Sheffield Spartans played in the third-tier National Ice Hockey League North 1. The Sheffield Shadows compete in the Women's national ice hockey league Division 1 Premier League and the Sheffield Ice Tigers play recreational level hockey.

The Sheffield Ice Hockey Academy also are based in Sheffield, and play out of IceSheffield, competing in the EIHA Junior North Leagues at U9, U11, U13, U15, U18, and U20, and usually enters a second team at each possible age group in the 2nd North division. The academy consistently develops and attracts top end talent, and have won many league and national titles. They have had one player, Liam Kirk, become the first (and only) born and trained British player to be drafted into the NHL, when he was drafted in the NHL entry draft 189th overall in 2018 by the Arizona Coyotes.

== Rugby League ==
Sheffield's representation in rugby league comes from Sheffield Eagles who formed in 1984. The club are based at Don Valley Stadium and currently compete in the Championship, the second tier of British rugby, which they won back to back in 2012 and 2013, however could not be promoted due to the Super League's licensing period. The club won the Rugby League Challenge Cup in 1998.

== Speedway ==
Sheffield Tigers is a local speedway team based at Owlerton Stadium. Speedway arrived at Owlerton in Sheffield in 1929 and a team took part in league speedway for a number of the pre-war seasons. The track re-opened in 1945 for a couple of meetings and the re-formed Tigers raced in the Northern League of 1946 and the National League Division Two 1947 – 1950. (In part of 1950 the team were known as The Tars.) In 1951 the promotion failed after competing in the Division Two Regional competition and a few open meetings were staged in 1952. The Tigers were revivied as members of the Provincial League in 1960 and have featured in league speedway most seasons since that date. The propmotion also staged speedway at Conference League level with the team known as the Owlerton Prowlers. Namesake Sheffield Tigers, of the speedway team, and Sheffield RUFC are local Rugby Union sides based at Dore.

== Other sports ==
In 2005 the city hosted the finish of Stage 3 of the Tour of Britain cycle race. In 2004 and 2005 the city also played host to the start and finish of the Roger Albert Clark Rally.

Sheffield Volleyball Club was founded in 1989 and runs men's and women's performance teams as well as providing opportunities for junior players.

The 2004 and 2007 Superbike World Champion, James Toseland, comes from Sheffield, as does the climber Joe Simpson.

The 2012 Men's Doubles Wimbledon champion Jonathan Marray lives in Sheffield, playing at the Hallamshire Tennis Club.

The City of Sheffield Athletic Club has bases at the Don Valley Stadium and the English Institute of Sport.

The Sheffield Buccaneers Fencing Club is based in Broomhill.

Sheffield City Swimming Club is based at Ponds Forge in Sheffield City Centre.

The Sheffield Steel Roller Girls roller derby league is based in the city, playing public bouts at Ponds Forge.

Sheffield has several field hockey clubs, the largest of which are the Sheffield Civica Hockey Club and Sheffield University Bankers Hockey Club – based at Goodwin – both of which play to a national level within English hockey and regionally.

Racing cyclist Malcolm Elliot whose successes include the 1988 Tour of Britain and the points jersey in the 1989 Vuelta a España is from Sheffield.

The Manor Grand Prix team that competed in Formula One from 2010 to 2016 was originally run from nearby Dinnington.

Sheffield also has a strong snowsports community and many competitors in the ski world are from Sheffield (particularly in "The Brits").

The Northern Academy of Performing Arts (NAPA) are a Colour Guard who compete in the UK circuit for Winter Guard (WGUK), and hail from Ecclesfield, Sheffield. The Northern Academy Open Class have been frequent champions of the national circuit.

== Sports Facilities ==
The city has a huge number of athletics facilities largely as a legacy of the £147 million pound investment for the World Student Games held in 1991. These include Don Valley Stadium, Ponds Forge and Sheffield Arena. Further venues have been added with the investment as part of the English Institute of Sport. A snooker venue and training centre is also due to be built.

As well as the annual World Snooker Championships, hosted by Sheffield's Crucible Theatre since 1977, this venue also has a Squash court installed each year for the English Open competition.

Sheffield Ski Village is Europe's largest artificial ski resort. It has a total of 5 slopes and several short training slopes, Sheffield Sharks Ski Club meets at the Ski Village. There are currently (2007) plans to add the country's largest indoor snow resort next to it. The city also has two indoor climbing centres, one of which is The School Room. Owlerton Stadium hosts regular greyhound racing as well as Sheffield Tigers home ties. It has also previously been home to Sheffield F.C., now based at the Coach and Horses Ground in Dronfield.

There are a number of golf courses in Sheffield, varying from "pitch and putt" up to at least 15 full size courses. Lee Westwood from nearby Worksop mainly uses Sheffield courses for practice. Arguably the most impressive is Hallamshire Golf Club based at Sandygate, which overlooks the city of Sheffield to the east and the Peak District to the west.

=== English Institute of Sport ===
In 1998 it was announced that Sheffield would host national headquarters of the UK Sports Institute with an anticipated investment of £40-£60 million. However, in October 1999 it was decided that a national headquarters should be scrapped in favour of a decentralised structure. Despite this, the largest sport-related investment in Sheffield so far, was the £23,540,000 English Institute of Sport - Sheffield (EISS), opened in December 2003. The £15.7 million iceSheffield, opened in May 2003, is also part of the project. Placed between the existing Sheffield Arena and Don Valley Stadium, this created one of the most concentrated areas of sports facilities in the country.

== Major Sporting Events ==
Event	Venue	Date
England Vs Scotland	Bramall Lane	10 March 1883	The first football international outside London and Glasgow.
Ashes Test England Vs Australia	Bramall Lane	1902
FA Cup Final Replay	Bramall Lane	1912
British Home Championship Vs Scotland	Hillsborough Stadium	10 April 1920
European Football Championship Qualifier Vs France	Hillsborough Stadium	3 October 1962	The last qualifying match not held at Wembley Stadium until its demolition in 2000.
1966 Football World Cup	Hillsborough	1966	Group games plus one quarter final between West Germany and Uruguay
World Snooker Championships	Crucible Theatre	1977 to present day
FA Cup Semi-final Liverpool Vs Nottingham Forest	Hillsborough Stadium	15 April 1989	Scene of the Hillsborough disaster
World Student Games	Don Valley Stadium, Ponds Forge, Sheffield Arena	1991
European Aquatics Championships	Ponds Forge	1993
European Football Championship	Hillsborough Stadium	1996	Hosted all Denmark's group matches
World Squash Masters	Hallamshire Tennis and Squash Club	1999
World Firefighters Games	Various	2004
Tour of Britain		2004–06	Professional Cycle Race
World Underwater Hockey Championships	Ponds Forge	August 2006
IAAF Athletics Grand Prix	Don Valley Stadium	August 2007
