= Sir Andrew Henley, 1st Baronet =

Member of the Parliament of England

Sir Andrew Henley, 1st baronet (1622–1675), of Bramshill, Hampshire was an English politician and the first of the Henley baronets. He is best remembered for his celebrated quarrel with the future Duke of Bolton, which is recorded in the Diary of Samuel Pepys.

He was the son of Robert Henley of Henley, Somerset, and his second wife Anne Eldred. His father was Chief Clerk in the King's Bench, in which office he amassed a fortune which enabled him to purchase lands in three counties, and his country seat at Bramshill House. As a Royalist he was forced to pay heavy fines after the English Civil War, but Andrew nonetheless came into a substantial inheritance on his father's death in 1656, which he largely wasted through his extravagance.

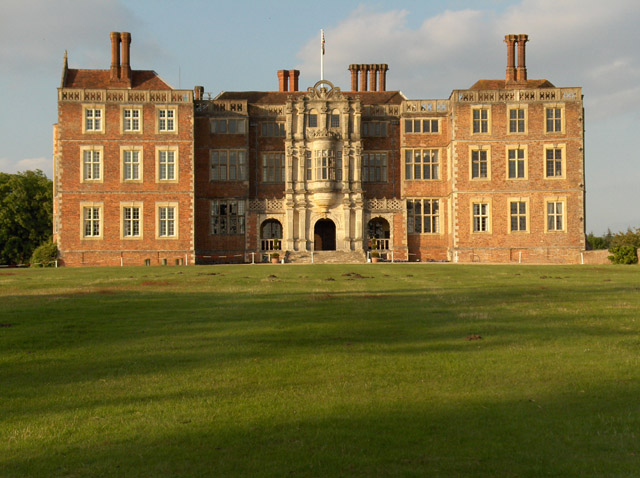
Bramshill House, the Henley family home

He was educated at Exeter College, Oxford. He entered the Inner Temple and was called to the Bar in 1646.

He was a Member (MP) of the Parliament of England for Portsmouth in 1660. He seems to have played no part in the Commons debates in that crucial year, and was not returned to the Cavalier Parliament the following year.

He was notoriously extravagant, although in his defence it should be said that the fortune his father accumulated had been greatly decreased by the fines imposed on him as a Royalist. Despite his debts, Andrew was able to buy the manor of Eversley, adjacent to Bramshill. He was accused by the local vicar of the sin of gluttony, although the only evidence of this seems to be that he employed a French chef.

He appears to have been a hot-tempered man, and his temper led in November 1666 into a quarrel which might have had the most serious consequences. Samuel Pepys records in his Diary that at Westminster Hall Henley became engaged in a fracas with Lord St. John, later the 1st Duke of Bolton, while the Court of Common Pleas was in session, and struck him on the head with his cane. He was arrested, imprisoned and charged with contempt coram rege (i.e. he was in theory in the presence of the King himself). He was not pardoned until 1668, a year after St.John received his pardon. Pepys does not give any reason for the quarrel: St. John, who like Henley was quarrelsome and hot-tempered, and appears to have provoked the quarrel, later said that he had been "in a passion" at the time. Pepys, who had a poor opinion of St. John, thought it was a pity that Henley had retaliated, for if he had not the judges might have dealt with St. John as he deserved.

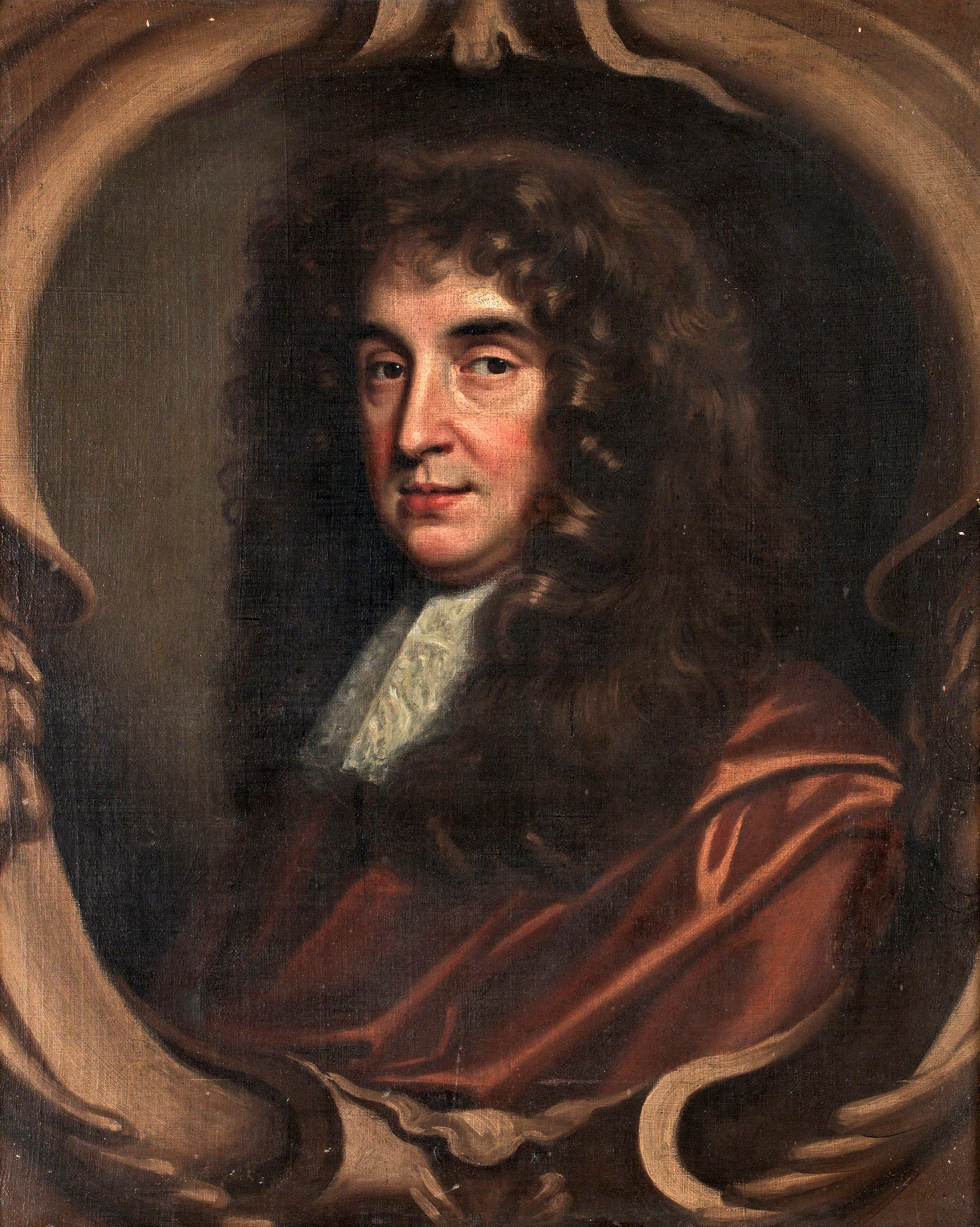
Lord St. John, later Duke of Bolton: his altercation with Henley in 1666 caused a considerable stir

He married firstly Mary Gayer, daughter of Sir John Gayer, Lord Mayor of London and his wife Katherine Hopkins, and secondly Constance Bromfield, daughter of Thomas Bromfield, and widow of Thomas Middleton. By his first wife, he had four children, including Robert, his heir, and Mary, who married as his third wife Sir Nicholas Slanning, 1st Baronet.

Baronetage of England
New creation	Baronet (of Henley); 1660–1675	Succeeded by Robert Henley
