= British National Fencing Museum =

Museum in Worcestershire, England

Coordinates: 52.0845721°N 2.27298°W

The British National Fencing Museum is the national museum for Great Britain for the sport and martial art of fencing. The museum was established in 2002 and is located at Hanley Swan in the locality of Malvern, Worcestershire, England.

== Background ==
The museum was established in 2002 by Malcolm Fare, a fencer and fencing historian. The museum holds documents the history of fencing since the 16th century, with a collection of over 200 weapons, 300 books and a number of other items and ephemera. The museum is not open to the public.

== See also ==
- Bramshill House
- British Fencing Association
