= Sheffield United Cricket Club =

Cricket club formed in 1854

Sheffield United Cricket Club is the first sports club or association in England to bear the word 'United' in its name, common amongst association football clubs in England today. Sheffield United Cricket Club was formed in 1854 by several local cricket clubs in Sheffield uniting, thus the name. The inclusion of 'United' in the name also distinguished it from the existing and longer-established Sheffield Cricket Club (circa 1751).

In 1854, M. J. Ellison, agent for the Duke of Norfolk, sought to establish a cricket ground in Sheffield. A piece of land was leased from the Duke of Norfolk. Local clubs were brought together as 'Sheffield United Cricket Club' to manage and play on the ground to be built on the land, with Ellison as president. The ground that was built on the land was completed in 1855, and called Bramall Lane. Sheffield United Cricket Club was a management committee, but did not have a team playing in that name until 1895.

The cricket clubs shared Bramall Lane with Sheffield FC, the world's oldest association football club, between 1862 and 1875, and with The Wednesday from 1880 to 1887. In 1889, the management committee decided to form a football club to replace Sheffield Wednesday, who had departed Bramall Lane in a dispute over gate receipts. Bearing the same name, Sheffield United F.C. was formed, not only to keep the cricket players together during the winter close season, but to generate the lost revenue following Wednesday's exit. Although the football club originated from the cricket club, and share a name, they are otherwise unrelated, and have been since the late 19th century.

Sheffield United Cricket Club won its first trophy in 1896, the Sheffield Challenge Cup against Kilnhurst. In 1900, the club was a founder member of the Yorkshire League.

The cricket club left Bramall Lane in 1973.

Sheffield United Cricket Club currently has four teams in the South Yorkshire Cricket League, two Sunday XIs in the Mansfield Cricket League and Junior Teams at U9, U11, U13, U15 and U18 age groups that play in the Ben Jessop Sheffield and District Junior League. Sheffield United Cricket club play on their own ground leased from Sheffield Hallam University and based within Sheffield Hallam University Sports Park, Bawtry Road, Tinsley, Sheffield.
