= Eversley Manor =

Coordinates: 51.339618°N 0.854011°W

Eversley Manor is a manor in Eversley, Hampshire, England. Mentioned in the Domesday Book, in 1669, it was purchased by Sir Andrew Henley of Bramshill House, who then ran it.

== History ==
The manor of Eversley for a considerable period was held by four freemen of King Edward the Confessor, but towards the close of his reign, that king transferred the overlordship to the abbey of St. Peter, Westminster. This charter was confirmed by William the Conqueror, and at the time of the Domesday Survey, Eversley, then assessed at four hides, was in the possession of the abbey. In 1280, the Abbot of Westminster, as overlord of Eversley, was summoned to show his claim. Though the result is not given on the roll, the abbot's warranty lay in the charter of Edward the Confessor. The overlordship continued with Westminster Abbey as late at least as the end of the 15th century, the manor being held by the annual payment of a yearling sparrowhawk. By the beginning of the 13th century, the four freemen had been succeeded in the actual ownership of Eversley by William de Wauton, who, in 1237, made an agreement with his tenant, William Banastre, about the mill pond in Eversley.

In 1251, Gilbert de Eversley was holding a hide of land in Eversley of William de Wauton, perhaps identical with the William de Wauton who, described as son and heir of Amisius de Wauton, sold the manor and advowson of Eversley for twenty-five marks to Alan de Hagheman or Haweman and Amice his wife in 1276. Three years later, Alan and Amice granted the reversion to John de Hagheman, who as lord of the manor presented a rector during the episcopacy of Henry Woodlock (1305–16). He died probably in the king's service abroad about 1320, and was succeeded by his son Nicholas de Hagheman, the rector of Eversley, who in 1336 granted the reversion of the manor and advowson to Thomas de Bradeston and Isabel his wife, and fifteen years later gave up all his right in return for an annuity of twenty marks and an annual payment of five cart-loads of hay at the feast of St. Peter ad Vincula.

In 1336, Thomas de Bradeston obtained a charter from Edward III, granting him free warren in his demesne lands of Eversley, a market every Monday, a yearly fair on the feast of St. Luke the Evangelist and the two days before and following, as well as a licence to enclose 300 acres (120 ha) of wood and pasture in Eversley, and to make a park of it. He died in 1359, leaving as his heir his grandson Thomas, who at his death in 1374, left an infant daughter Elizabeth to succeed him. Elizabeth brought the manor in marriage to her husband, Sir Walter de la Pole, lord of Sawston, Meldreth, and Trumpington in Cambridgeshire, who died seised in 1434. Their only daughter Margaret, who had married Thomas Ingaldesthorp, had died in 1426, and the manor consequently passed to their grandson Edmund Ingaldesthorp, who was afterwards knighted, and died in 1456, his heir being his daughter Isabel, aged fifteen. Isabel married Sir John Nevill, who was created Marquess of Montagu in 1470, and was slain at the Battle of Barnet a year later; and Sir William Norris of Rycote, Oxfordshire, and died seised of the manor of Eversley in 1476. Her son and heir by her first husband, George, had been created Duke of Bedford by Edward IV in 1470, but, having no means of sustaining his honours in consequence of the forfeiture of his paternal inheritance, was degraded from the peerage by Act of Parliament in 1477. He died childless six years later, and his estates were divided among his five sisters and co-heirs, Eversley falling to Lucy, who married Sir Thomas Fitz William of Aldwark, North Yorkshire; and Sir Anthony Browne. By her first husband, she left children, Sir William Fitz William, Lord High Admiral of England, who was created Earl of Southampton in 1537, and died at Newcastle upon Tyne in 1542 while leading the van of the English army into Scotland. By his will dated 10 September 1542, the earl left most of his estates, including Eversley, to his halfbrother, Sir Anthony Browne, who died in 1548, leaving a son and heir, Sir Anthony Browne. The latter was created Viscount Montagu on 2 September 1554, and joined with his wife Magdalene in selling the manor, park, and advowson of Eversley to Deodatus Staverton in 1582.

Deodatus soon afterwards engaged in a dispute with his customary tenants of Eversley concerning the woods growing upon their tenements, the payment of fines, and other customs—a dispute which was ended in 1586 by an award of the Court of Chancery —and died in 1590. By his will, dated 8 April 1590, he left the manor to his brother Thomas Staverton, who before 1616 had been succeeded by another Deodatus Staverton. In 1669, Sir Andrew Henley, of Bramshill, purchased the manor from William Lucy and Anne his wife, daughter of Deodatus Staverton, and heiress of her brother Francis, and from this date Eversley has followed the same descent as Bramshill.
