= Bramshill SSSI =

UK Site of Special Scientific Interest

Coordinates: 51.339°N 0.905°W

Bramshill
- Site of Special Scientific Interest
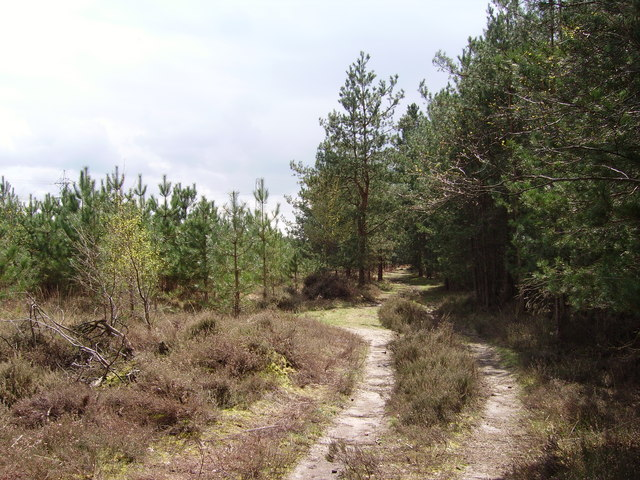
- Location of Bramshill.
- Area of search: Hampshire
- Grid reference: SU 764 606
- Interest: Biological
- Area: 673.3 hectares (1,664 acres)
- Notification date: 2000
- Location map: Magic Map

Bramshill is a 673.3-hectare (1,664-acre) biological Site of Special Scientific Interest near Bramshill, northeast of Basingstoke in Hampshire. It is part of Thames Basin Heaths Special Protection Area for the conservation of wild birds.

This site has a conifer plantation with internationally important populations of woodlarks, nightjars and Dartford warblers. There are also several pools and mires, which have large populations of dragonflies and damselflies, together with an unimproved meadow which provides a habitat for a nationally rare flowering plant, small fleabane.
