= Henley baronets =

Extinct baronetcy in the Baronetage of England

Escutcheon of the Henley baronets of Henley

The Henley baronetcy, of Henley in the County of Somerset, was a title in the Baronetage of England. It was created on 20 June 1660 for Andrew Henley, Member of Parliament for Portsmouth. The 2nd Baronet was Member of Parliament for Bridport.

The title became extinct on the death of the 4th Baronet in 1740.

== Henley baronets, of Henley (1660) ==
- Sir Andrew Henley, 1st Baronet (1622–1675)
- Sir Robert Henley, 2nd Baronet (died 1681)
- Sir Andrew Henley, 3rd Baronet (died 1703)
- Sir Robert Henley, 4th Baronet (died 1740)
