= The Sword (magazine) =

The Sword is the official magazine of the British Fencing Association (BFA) and is issued to every fully subscribed member and the BFA's affiliates, or for sale to non-members. The magazine was established in 1948. It is published quarterly.

The Sword details the results of recent domestic and international fencing competitions in all three weapons, both sexes and in all age groups (including cadet, junior, senior and veteran). It has a regular statement from the president of the BFA, recent fencing news (usually non-piste related events such as changes of venue and new equipment standards etc.) and miscellaneous articles on the country's top fencers and coaches. The magazine always includes a "Round - up" section which reviews recent competition results, detailing fights and scores etc. as well as including pictures of the winners and/or the competition. The magazine finishes with the results lists, up to the last 32, of every recent fencing competition (both domestic and international).

The magazine also includes adverts and entry forms for upcoming competitions and training camps, as well as equipment manufacturers.

The Sword is edited by Malcolm Fare and is printed and published by Warwick Printing Co Ltd.
