= List of Maccabiah medalists in fencing (men) =

This is an incomplete list of men's Maccabiah medalists in fencing from 1932 to 2005.

== Foil, Individual ==
Games	Gold	Silver	Bronze
1953 Maccabiah Games	(United States) Allan Kwartler (USA)	Unknown	David Silverstone (Canada)
1957 Maccabiah Games	Unknown	Unknown	Unknown
1989 Maccabiah Games	(United States) Jeff Bukantz (USA)	Unknown	Unknown
2001 Maccabiah Games	Unknown	(United States) Jonathan Tiomkin (USA)	Unknown
2005 Maccabiah Games	(Israel) Tomer Or (ISR)	(United States) Dan Kellner (USA)	Unknown
2017 Maccabiah Games	Unknown	Unknown	Unknown

== Foil, Team ==
Games	Gold	Silver	Bronze
2001 Maccabiah	Unknown	United States (USA)	Unknown
2005 Maccabiah	Israel (ISR)	United States (USA)	Russia (RUS)
2017 Maccabiah	Israel (ISR)	United States (USA)	Unknown

2022 Gold USA (United States) (Nicholas Baumstein, Zack Binder, David Prilutsky). Silver Israel (Maor Hatoel, Niran Czuckermann, Aziz Shami). Bronze Great Britain.

== Épée, Individual ==
Games	Gold	Silver	Bronze
1961 Maccabiah	Unknown	(Canada) Peter Bakonyi (CAN)	(Canada) Abbey Silverstone (CAN)
1977 Maccabiah	(France) Yves Dreyfus (FRA)	Unknown	Unknown
1993 Maccabiah	Unknown	Unknown	(Canada) Sandro Di Cori (CAN)
1997 Maccabiah	(Canada) Sandro Di Cori (CAN)	Unknown	Unknown
2001 Maccabiah	(Israel) ? (ISR)	(France) Raphael 'l'anguille' Crespelle (FRA)	(France) Julien Hababou (FRA)
2005 Maccabiah	(Israel) Marat Yisraeli (ISR)	(United States) Michael Feldschuh (USA)	(Israel) Viacheslav Zingerman (ISR)

== Épée, Team ==
Games	Gold	Silver	Bronze
1977 Maccabiah	France (FRA)	Unknown	Unknown
1989 Maccabiah	Canada (CAN)	United States (USA)	Israel (ISR)
1993 Maccabiah	Israel (ISR)	Unknown	Canada (CAN)
1997 Maccabiah	Israel (ISR)	Canada (CAN)	United States (USA)
2001 Maccabiah	France (FRA)	Israel (ISR)	Russia (RUS)
2005 Maccabiah	Israel (ISR)	United States (USA)	France (FRA)

== Sabre, Individual ==
Games	Gold	Silver	Bronze
1950 Maccabiah	(United States) Allan Kwartler (USA)	Unknown	Unknown
1957 Maccabiah	(United States) Byron Krieger (USA)	Unknown	Unknown
2001 Maccabiah	(Russia) Sergey Sharikov (RUS)	(Ukraine) Vadim Gutzeit (UKR)	(United States) Matt Fabricant (USA)
2005 Maccabiah	(Ukraine) Vadim Gutzeit (UKR)	(Russia) Sergey Sharikov (RUS)	(Russia) Vladislav Shamis (RUS)

- 2017, gold, Eli Dershwitz, US.

== Sabre, Team ==
Games	Gold	Silver	Bronze
2005 Maccabiah	Ukraine (UKR)	Russia (RUS)	United States (USA)
