= Ottawa Fencing Club =

- Type: fencing organization based in Canada
- Legal status: active
- Purpose: advocate and public voice, educator and network
- Headquarters: Ottawa, Ontario, Canada
- Region served: Canada
- Official language: English, French
- Website: www.ottawafencing.ca

Ottawa Fencing Club is a club for the sport of fencing in Ottawa, Ontario, Canada. It consists of affiliate clubs such as EXO Fencing and RA Fencing Club. Ottawa Fencing has produced over 18 Olympic competitors. Ottawa Fencing and its affiliate clubs have had representatives at the Olympics since 1976. At the 2006 Commonwealth fencing championships Games in Belfast, Marc-André Leblanc of the Ottawa Fencing Club was a member of the winning Canadian men's épée team. Ottawa Fencing Club serves both beginners and experienced fencers.
