= British Fencing =

Governing body of fencing for the UK

- Sport: Fencing
- Jurisdiction: United Kingdom
- Abbreviation: BF
- Affiliation: FIE
- Regional affiliation: CEE
- Headquarters: London
- Chairman: Sara Pantuliano CMG
- CEO: Georgina Usher MBE

Official website
- britishfencing.com
- (United Kingdom)

British Fencing (BF), formerly the British Fencing Association, is the national governing body (NGB) for the sport of fencing in the United Kingdom. The British Fencing office is based at 1 Baron's Gate, 33-35 Rothschild Road, London W4 5HT. Its current Chief Executive is Georgina Usher.

== History ==
In 1902, the Amateur Fencing Association (AFA) was founded as the governing body for amateur fencing in the UK. The requirements for amateurism have now been dissolved, and professionalism is permitted in the UK, so in 1996 the name was changed to the British Fencing Association. (The British Academy of Fencing, a membership body for professional fencing coaches, was not founded in its current form until 1949).

The AFA's had combined twin roles as both the home country governing body for England and national governing body for the UK. In 2002 in response to public funding frameworks, a new, separate body - England Fencing - was formed specifically to carry out governing body activities for England. Over time, the boundary between the two roles has eroded.

== Activities of British Fencing ==
BF is responsible for all international fencing conducted while representing Great Britain. They control the selection criteria for all relevant competitions. They are responsible for any attendance by fencers at official FIE competitions, including the World Championships and World Cup competitions, and also at the Olympics under the IOC.

BF is also responsible for all national domestic events. It runs the British Fencing Championships in a variety of age categories and at all three weapons of fencing (foil, épée and sabre). BF licenses member clubs and competition organisers to run fencing competitions some of which earn participants ranking points. These points are used by the BFA to create national rankings at senior, junior (U20) and cadet (U17) level.

BF is responsible for ensuring that the sport has a robust governance structure, appropriately insured, and that those operating within the sport are appropriately qualified. It sets out the safety standards, rules and guidelines under which the sport operates, runs coaching schemes, and other activities relating to the promotion of fencing in the United Kingdom. In addition it runs a talent programme (funded by Sport England) to support young fencers (14-23) demonstrating motivation and capability to represent Great Britain. BF publishes an online magazine, The Sword and collects membership fees on behalf of all the Home Country Associations - 40% of membership fees collected is passed to these associations.

== Sponsorship ==
In December 2015, a five-year sponsorship deal worth £1million with Beazley, the specialist Lloyd's insurer came to an end. During that time the investment from Beazley helped fund Great Britain teams (including Paralympic hopefuls), The National Academy, programs for increased grassroots participation to the sport, British Fencing run events, including World Cup events as well as marketing and promotion of the sport.

== World Class Performance Programme ==
Until March 2017 BF operated a World Class Performance Programme (WCPP) which was a programme, funded by UK Sport, which helped British Fencing to fund athletes likely to achieve podium success at the Olympic Games.

Under this programme, the Men's Foil Team qualified for Rio 2016 which was the first time that a Fencing team had qualified under the system introduced by the FIE 20 years ago. The team achieved sixth - narrowly losing to Russia, the eventual winners - and Richard Kruse came fourth in the individual event.

In December 2016, UK Sport announced that they had withdrawn funding from fencing. In the funding review, Fencing was banded by UK Sport as Band 4. This means that Fencing was considered a 'possible' not 'probable' medal winning sport for Tokyo 2020. Along with all the other sports in Band 4, Fencing lost its WCP funding.

== Rankings ==
Fencers are ranked by category (Cadet, Junior and Senior), weapon (foil, épée or sabre) and gender. Rankings are calculated from ranking points earned in competitions attended by the fencers. The number of points earned depends on the strength of the competition as well as how well the fencer did.

== Governance ==
The Board of British Fencing (BF) is responsible for the overall governance, development and management of the sport of fencing in GB. The Board sets the strategic direction of the sport, appoints the CEO and monitors progress and results. The Board published the 2030 Strategy 'En Garde for the future'

The board consists of twelve board directors, of whom four are elected and eight are appointed by the board (these four being the chair of the Board and of British Fencing, an additional director and two independent directors). The board's quorum rules specify that the elected members must always be in the majority. In addition to these voting directors, board meetings are attended by the BF president and home country and athlete representatives. Staff members attend some meetings, or parts of meetings, to brief/advise the Board.

In December 2020, British Fencing was successful in securing a 1 year investment from UK Sport of £418K (to run from 1st April 2021-31st March 2022) with an indicative £1.6m to March 2025, based on achieving agreed objectives. This funding consisted of “Progression” funding, and for a period of time up to April 2023, funding for one named Podium Athlete.

In 2022, following a transfer of responsibilities from British Disability Fencing, British Fencing’s remit expanded to include Para Fencing (formally wheelchair fencing). Unlike many other para sports, para fencing had previously been governed separately. The transfer of responsibilities from British Disability Fencing (BDF) to British Fencing (BF) brought fencers together under one NGB for the first time.

In December 2024 UK Sport confirmed a four year £1.575k award to support long term Olympic success in fencing.

British Fencing was awarded £1.725million by UK Sport for the Los Angeles development sport funding, 2025 - 2029.

== Subdivisions ==
Under its auspices the six Home Nations (Wales, England, Northern Ireland, Guernsey, Jersey and Scotland) have their own governing bodies. The country is further subdivided into regions.

=== Home nations governing bodies ===
- Welsh Fencing
- England Fencing
- Northern Ireland Fencing
- Guernsey Union d'Escrime
- Scottish Fencing

=== Regions ===
- East Midlands
- Eastern
- Guernsey
- Jersey
- London
- North East
- North West
- Northern Ireland
- Scotland Central
- Scotland East
- Scotland North
- Scotland West
- South East
- South West
- Southern
- Wales
- West Midlands
- Yorkshire

== See also ==
- British National Fencing Museum
- British Fencing Championships
