= Crookes & Crosspool (ward) =

Electoral ward in the City of Sheffield, South Yorkshire, England

Coordinates: 53.388°N 1.505°W

- Shown within Sheffield
- Population: 16,800
- Metropolitan borough: City of Sheffield
- Metropolitan county: South Yorkshire
- Region: Yorkshire and the Humber
- Country: England
- Sovereign state: United Kingdom
- UK Parliament: Sheffield Hallam
- Councillors: Sheffield City Council; Minesh Parekh (Labour and Co-operative); Ruth Milsom (Labour Party); Tim Huggan (Liberal Democrats)

Crookes & Crosspool ward—which includes the districts of Crookes, Steelbank, Crosspool, and Sandygate —is one of the 28 electoral wards in City of Sheffield, England. It is located in the western part of the city and covers an area of 3.9 km^{2}. The population of this ward in 2011 was 17,700 people in 7,266 households.

The current councillors for Crookes and Crosspool Ward are Minesh Parekh (Labour and Co-operative), Ruth Milsom (Labour), and Tim Huggan (Liberal Democrats).

Crookes and Crosspool ward is mostly located within Sheffield Hallam Parliamentary constituency. The local MP is Labour's Olivia Blake, who won the seat in December 2019. Parts of the ward also cross into the Sheffield Central constituency, represented by Labour's Abtisam Mohamed since 2024.

== Election history ==
In the 2004 local elections Liberal Democrats Sylvia Anginotti, John Hesketh, and Brian Holmes, were returned as councillors for the newly drawn ward. John Hesketh was defeated by Labour's Geoff Smith in 2011.

In the 2016 local elections that took place under redrawn boundaries, Labour's Anne Murphy and Craig Gamble-Pugh were returned along with the Liberal Democrats’ Adam Hanrahan. In 2018 Mohammed Mahroof defeated Labour's Craig Gamble-Pugh, leaving Anne Murphy as the remaining Labour Councillor. In 2019 Liberal Democrat, Tim Huggan successfully defended the seat vacated by Adam Hanrahan.

In 2021 Labour's Ruth Milsom successfully defended the seat vacated by Anne Murphy.

In 2022, Liberal Democrat incumbent, Mohammed Mahroof, lost his seat to the Labour and Co-operative candidate, Minesh Parekh. In 2023, Crookes and Crosspool Councillor Minesh Parekh was shortlisted as an 'Inspiring Locally Elected Leader' in The Climate Coalition's Green Heart Hero Awards.

== Districts of Crookes ward ==
=== Crookes ===
Crookes (grid reference SK328877) is a suburb of the City of Sheffield, England, about 1.6 miles (2.6 km) west of the city centre. It borders Broomhill to the south, Walkley and Crookesmoor to the east and open countryside around the River Rivelin to the north. It is home to a large student population from the nearby University of Sheffield, and contained the university's Tapton Hall of Residence until this was demolished in 2014.

=== Steel Bank ===
An area of terraced housing in Crookes, Sheffield. Steel Bank is a steep hill that starts from Springvale Road to the South and Northfield Road to the North. It stretches from Western Road to Heavygate Road which borders on the S6 postcode and the Walkley council ward. Roads on Steel Bank are Western Road, Brighton Terrace Road, Melbourn Road, Mona Road, and the very steep Townend Street and Bates Street. Slinn Street sits at the top of Steel Bank. Aldred Road and Bradley Street are also part of the Steel Bank area of Crookes. The name 'Steel Bank' is rarely used, and most would just call the area 'Crookes'. Steel Bank has one pub named 'The Princess Royal'. This is an old local pub situated on Slinn Street.

=== Sandygate ===
Sandygate (grid reference SK310867) is a residential area on the western tip of Sheffield. It is home to the oldest football ground in the world, Sandygate Road, which has been home to Hallam C.C since 1804 and Hallam F.C. since 1860. Hallamshire Golf Course is also located in the area.

=== Crosspool ===
Crosspool is a residential area on the western outskirts of Sheffield. It contains four large schools, Lydgate Junior School, Lydgate Infant School, Tapton School, and King Edward VII Lower School.
