= List of university fencing clubs =

Here is a list of historical and current Fencing Clubs that run within Universities.

== Australia ==
University	Fencing Club	Established
University of Adelaide	ADELAIDE UNIVERSITY FENCING CLUB	1896
Australian National University	Australian National University Fencing Club	1896
La Trobe University	La Trobe University Fencing Club	1896
University of Melbourne	Melbourne University Fencing Club	1896
Monash University	Monash University Fencing Club	1896
University of Sydney	Sydney University Fencing Club	1896
University of Technology Sydney	UTS Fencing Club	1896
University of Western Australia	UWA Fencing Club	1896

== England ==
University	Fencing Club	Established
University of Cambridge	Cambridge University Fencing Club	1896
University of Oxford	Oxford University Fencing Club	1891
University of Liverpool	Liverpool University Fencing Club	1936
Oxford Brookes University	Oxford Brookes University Fencing Club	-

== Wales ==
University	Fencing Club	Welsh Name	Established
University of Wales, Trinity Saint David	Saint David's University College Fencing Club (Lampeter Campus)	Clwb Cleddyfa Coleg Prifysgol Dewi Sant	-
Bangor University	Bangor University Fencing Club	-	-
Swansea University	Swansea University Fencing Club	-	-
Cardiff University	Cardiff University Fencing Club	-	-
Aberystwyth University	Aberystwyth University Fencing Club	-	-

== See also ==
- Australian Fencing Federation
