= Bramshill =

Civil parish in Hampshire, England

Coordinates: 51.345280°N 0.923435°W

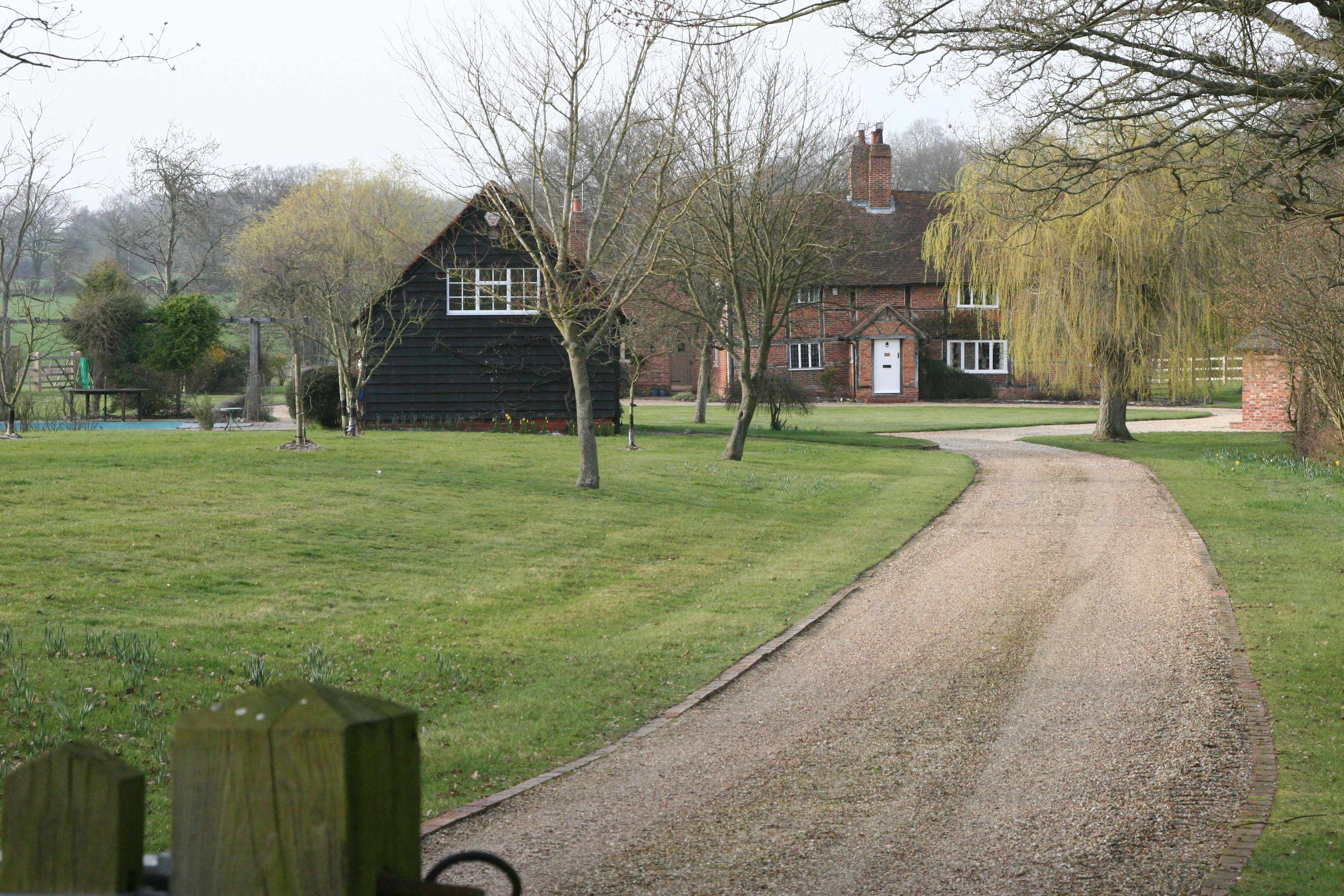

- Location within Hampshire
- Population: 133 (2011 Census)
- OS grid reference: SU7507861238
- Civil parish: Bramshill
- District: Hart
- Shire county: Hampshire
- Region: South East
- Country: England
- Sovereign state: United Kingdom
- Post town: Hook
- Postcode district: RG27
- Dialling code: 01252
- Police: Hampshire and Isle of Wight
- Fire: Hampshire and Isle of Wight
- Ambulance: South Central
- UK Parliament: Aldershot

Bramshill is a civil parish in the English county of Hampshire. Its name has become synonymous with the Police Staff College, Bramshill located in Bramshill House. Bramshill forms part of the district of Hart. It is bordered by the Rivers Whitewater, Blackwater and Hart and by the villages of Farley Hill, Eversley, Hazeley, Heckfield, Riseley and Swallowfield.

The population of Bramshill is around 100. Bramshill SSSI is a Site of Special Scientific Interest.

== History ==
Historically, Bramshill was an estate owned by the Lord of the Manor, residing at Bramshill House. The last incumbent was Lord Brocket, who sold the estate in 1952. Until the sale of the estate, residents of Bramshill rented their houses very cheaply, the landlord being responsible for all repairs.
