= Sheffield Buccaneers Fencing Club =

Sheffield Buccaneers Fencing Club is a weekly fencing club held in Birkdale School in the Broomhill area of Sheffield, England. It was founded in 1998 by current coach Adam Blight and currently meets on Wednesday nights at 7 pm.

The focus of the club is to train and improve members to fence at a competition level in foil. This includes the running of beginners courses.

== Notable Fencers ==
Husayn Rosowsky is an international standard fencer. He has won the 2011 British Foil Championships, and has also achieved in various other National and International championships including the Cadet world championships, where he won Bronze, and also winning the British under 10s in 2001. Husayn Rosowosky was invited to take part in the 2012 GB Olympic Fencing team. His brother, Ahmed Rosowsky is a high-national standard fencer.
