= Fencing rules =

Set of protocols and behaviors used in competitive fencing

Fencing practice and techniques of modern competitive fencing are governed by the International Fencing Federation (FIE), though they developed from conventions developed in 21st century Europe to govern fencing as a martial art and a gentlemanly pursuit. The modern weapons for sport fencing are the foil, épée, and sabre.

== Playing area ==
A fencing bout takes place on a strip, or piste, which, according to the current FIE regulations, should be between 1.5 and 2 metres (4.9–6.6 ft) wide and 14 metres (46 ft) long. There are two en-garde lines (where the fencers stand at the beginning of the bout) two metres (6.6 ft) either side of the midpoint. There are also two warning lines two metres from either end of the strip, to provide retreating fencers knowledge of their position on the piste. Retreating off of the strip scores a touch for the opponent.

Fencing strip: (C) center line; (G) guard lines; (D) last 2 meters zone

1. Scoring System:
  - Fencers connect to an electrical scoring system.
  - Red and Green Lights: Indicate valid hits on target areas.
  - White Lights: Indicate off-target hits in foil and sabre.
  - The referee decides the validity of hits and awards points.
2. Bout Progression:
  - Preparation: Fencers connect to the scoring apparatus and test equipment.
  - Salutes: Exchanged as a sign of respect.
  - Starting: Commands given by the referee are "on guard", "ready", "play" (or "fence"). Often, in international competitions, the same formula is pronounced in French ("en garde, pret, allez").
  - Exchanges: Involve engaging in fencing phrases. The referee calls "halt" to pause and explain significant actions and update the score.
  - Reasons for Halt: Include stepping off the piste, bodily contact, invalid actions, or safety issues.
  - Restarting: Depending on the situation, the bout restarts from the stopping point or from the on-guard lines. If one fencer had stepped off-piste during the action, he will be forced to take a step back. On restart, the fencers are always set at the same distance as the en garde lines.
  - Ending: The bout ends when the winning margin is reached or time expires. In case of a tie, only possible in epee and foil, an additional minute is played for a sudden-death point. Before the overtime minute starts, one of the two fencers is randomly awarded a tie-breaker, meaning that if no hits are scored within the extra minute, the fencer holding the tie-breaker will win the bout.

== Participants ==
There are at least three people involved: two fencers and a referee, formerly called a "director" or "president of the jury". The referee may be assisted by a jury of two or four line-judges. The primary job of this jury was to watch for hits scored, however the arrival of the electronic scoring apparatus has rendered them largely redundant. Under current FIE rules, a fencer may ask for two side-judges (one to watch each fencer) if they think that the referee is failing to notice some infringement of the rules on their opponent's part such as use of the unarmed hand, substitution of the valid target area, breaching the boundary of the piste etc.

== Protocol and rules ==
The referee stands at the side of the piste. The fencers walk on piste fully dressed, aside from the mask. If necessary, they plug their body wires into the spools connected to the electronic scoring apparatus and test their weapons against each other, to make sure everything is functioning. They then retreat to their en-garde lines.

Prior to starting a bout, the fencers must salute each other. Refusal to do so can result in a fencer's suspension or disqualification. Both fencers must salute each other and the referee. They may choose to salute the audience. In non-electric events the four judges should also be saluted. There are many variations of the salute, including some fairly theatrical ones, but the common theme is that the fencer stands upright, mask off, facing whomever they are saluting and raises their sword to a vertical position with the guard either at or just below face level, and then lowers it again. Various apocryphal stories about the origin of the salute circulate, like gladiators saluting each other in the arena, crusaders pointing their sword heavenward in pre-battle prayer, duellists showing each other that their swords are the same length, etc. The most likely source of the modern fencing salute is the "Present arms" command from military drill, which originated in the 16th century.

After the salutes are completed, the referee will call "En garde!" The fencers put on their masks and adopt the fencing stance with the front foot behind the en-garde line and, in foil, with the blade in the sixte line. They are now in the on-guard (en garde) position. The referee then calls "Ready?" In some countries, the fencers are required to confirm that they are. Finally the referee will call "Fence!", and the bout will start. Judging is often done in French, in which case the referee will say "En garde! Prêts? Allez!" or, if both fencers are female, "En garde! Prêtes? Allez!" (In some circles, beginning the bout with the order "fence" is deemed incorrect, but in others the use of "play" is discouraged due to the phonetic similarity with the French "prêts". The use of "fence" is contrary to the rules in certain countries.)

This is the start of a phrase i.e. an any unbroken chain of recognizable offensive and defensive actions, such as lunging or parrying performed by the two fencers. The phrase ends when a referee has reason to stop the bout, such as corps a corps (the action of two fencers coming into physical contact with one another with any portion of their bodies or hilts), a hit (on or off-target), or a penalty, or when both fencers return to passivity. To interrupt the bout the referee calls "Halt!" (if judging in French, the term is "Halte!", pronounced like "Halt!" in English), a bout may be interrupted for several reasons: a touch has been made, the rules have been breached, the situation is unsafe, or the action has become so disorganized that the referee can no longer follow it. Once the bout is stopped, the referee will, if necessary, explain their reasons for stopping it, analyze what has just happened and award points or give out penalties.

If a point has been awarded, then the competitors return to their en-garde lines; if not, they remain approximately where they were when the bout was interrupted. The referee will then restart the bout as before. If the fencers were within lunging distance when the bout was interrupted and they are not required to return to their en-garde lines, the referee will ask both fencers to give sufficient ground to ensure a fair start. A common way of establishing the correct distance is to ask both fencers to straighten their arms and to step back to the point where their blades no longer overlap in the referee's view. If a fencer needs to stop the bout to adjust their mask or tie their shoe, or something else requires the referee's attention, they may do so by tapping their back foot and/or waving their back hand and the referee will generally call a halt. Tapping the front foot is called an appel and is actually a tactical move, intended to distract the opposing fencer; thus, the referee may ignore a front-foot tap.

This procedure is repeated until either one of the fencers has reached the required number of points (generally, 1, 5, or 15, depending on the format of the bout) or until the time allowed for the bout runs out.

Fencing bouts are timed for foil and epee: the clock is started every time the referee calls "Allez" and stopped every time they call "Halt!". The bout must stop after three minutes of fencing (or 8 touches in saber). In 15 point bouts, a 1-minute break occurs in between the three-minute intervals. If 9 minutes of fencing time elapse in a 15 touch bout, or 3 in a 5 touch bout, the bout is over and the current scores are taken as final. If the score is tied when time runs out then the director determines priority randomly. After priority is determined the fencers bout for one minute. If a point is scored, then that fencer wins, however if no points are scored then the fencer with priority wins. Note that this concept of priority is not the same as the priority used in foil and sabre to determine right-of-way. Sabre, due to its faster pace of action, does not require to keep track of the time. Instead, for 15-point bouts, two fractions are played with the break happening as soon as one fencer reaches 8 points.

Since July 1, 2020 (and reconfirmed by FIE public notice in September 2020 and in January 2021), by public written notice the FIE had replaced its previous handshake requirement with a "salute" by the opposing fencers, and written in its public notice that handshakes were "suspended until further notice."

After the Olga Kharlan handshaking incident in 2023, the International Fencing Federation changed its rules so that the previously required handshakes between fencers at the end of a bout would become optional, with a distance greeting permitted instead.

== Priority ("Right of way") ==
Foil and sabre are governed by priority rules, according to which fencer first initiated a correctly executed attack, as described in the following paragraphs. When both fencers hit more or less simultaneously, only the fencer who had priority receives the point. If priority cannot be assigned unambiguously, no points are awarded. These rules were adopted in the 18th century as part of teaching practice. Their aim is to encourage "sensible" fencing and reward initiative and circumspection at the same time, in particular, to reward fencers for properly made attacks, and penalize fencers for attacking into such an attack that lands, an action that could be lethal with sharp blades. The risk of both duelists charging onto one another's swords is kept to a minimum. At least in principle, in a prolonged phrase, the initiative passes smoothly from one fencer to the other, and back again, and so on. In practice, most phrases are broken off quickly if neither fencer lands.

== Penalties ==
Modern fencing also includes the addition of penalty cards or flags. Each card has a different meaning. A fencer penalized with a yellow card is warned, but no other action is taken. A fencer penalized with a red card is warned, and a touch is awarded to their opponent. A fencer penalized with a black card is excluded from the competition, and may be excluded from the tournament, expelled from the venue, or suspended from future tournaments in the case of serious offenses. Additionally, spectators can be carded or expelled.

Offenses are broken down into four groups, and penalties are assessed based upon the group of the offense.

- Group 1 offenses include actions such as making bodily contact with the opposing fencer (in foil or saber), delaying the bout, or removing equipment. The first group 1 offense committed by a fencer in a bout is penalized with a yellow card. Subsequent group 1 offenses committed by that fencer are penalized with a red card.
- Group 2 offenses include actions that are vindictive or violent in nature, or the failure to report to the strip with proper inspection marks on equipment. All group 2 offenses are penalized with a red card.
- Group 3 offenses include disturbing the order of a bout, or intentionally falsifying inspection marks. The first group 3 offense committed by a fencer is penalized with a red card, while any subsequent group 3 offense is penalized with a black card.
- Group 4 offenses include doping, manifest cheating, and other breaches of protocol, such as a refusal to salute. Group 4 offenses are penalized with a black card.

There is also a specific penalty for putting one or both feet off the side edge of the piste: halt is called, and the opponent may then advance one meter towards the penalized fencer. The penalized fencer must retreat to 'normal' distance before the bout can restart – that is, the distance where both fencers can stand on-guard, with their arms and swords extended directly at their opponent, and their blades do not cross. If this puts the fencer beyond the back edge of the piste, the fencer's opponent receives a point.

== Scoring ==
=== Non-electronic scoring ===
Prior to the introduction of electronic scoring equipment, the president of jury was assisted by four judges. Two judges were positioned behind each fencer, one on each side of the strip. The judges watched the fencer opposite to see if he was hit. This system is sometimes called "dry" fencing (USA) or "steam" (United Kingdom, Australia) fencing.

When any of the judges thinks they saw a hit, that judge raises their hand. The president (referee or director) then stops the bout and reviews the relevant phases of the action, polling the judges at each stage to determine whether there was a touch, and (in foil and sabre) whether the touch was valid or invalid. The judges answer "Yes", "Yes, but off-target" (in foil and sabre), "No", or "Abstain". Each judge has one vote, and the president has one and a half votes. Thus, two judges could overrule the president; but if the judges disagreed, or if one judge abstained, the president's opinion rules.

Épée fencing was later conducted with red dye on the tip, easily seen on the white uniform. As a bout went on, if a touch was seen, a red mark would appear. Between the halts of the director, judges would inspect each fencer for any red marks. Once one was found, it was circled in a dark pencil to show that it had already been counted. The red dye was not easily removed, preventing any cheating. The only way to remove it was through certain acids such as vinegar.

Non-electronic scoring methods were plagued by uncertain rulings, due to the small points of the weapons, the speed at which the sport was played, and obscuring movements from the fencers. In addition there were frequent problems with bias and collusion, leading to the wry expression that a dry jury consisted of "4 blind men and a thief". Some fencers, particularly in sabre, would hit hard to ensure their touches could not be missed, and dry sabre could be an extremely painful undertaking despite the protective jackets. Even in the best of circumstances, it was very difficult to accurately score hits, and it systematically under-reported valid touches to hard-to-see areas, such as the back or flank under the arm.

=== Electronic scoring ===
Electronic scoring is used in all major national and international, and most local, competitions. At Olympic level, it was first introduced to épée in 1936, to foil in 1956, and to sabre in 1988.

The central component of the scoring system is commonly known as "the box". In the simplest version both fencers' weapons are connected to the box via long retractable cables. The box normally carries a set of lights to signal when a touch has been made. (Larger peripheral lights are also often used.) In foil and sabre, because of the need to distinguish on-target hits from off-target ones, special conductive clothing and wires must be worn. This includes a lamé, (a jacket of conducting cloth) for both weapons, a body cord to connect the weapon to the system, a reel of retractable cable that connects to the scoring box and in the case of sabre, a conducting mask and cuff (manchette) as the head and arms are valid target areas.

Recently, reel-less gear has been adopted for all weapons at top competitions. In this system, which eliminates the spool (by using the fencer's own body as a grounding point), the lights and detectors are mounted directly on the fencers' masks. For the sake of the audience, clearly visible peripheral lights triggered by wireless transmission may be used. However, the mask lights must remain as the official indicators because FIE regulations prohibit the use of wireless transmitters in official scoring equipment in order to prevent cheating. The development of reel-less scoring apparatus in épée and foil has been much slower due to technical complications. The first international competitions to use the reel-less versions of these weapons were held in 2006.

In the case of foil and épée, hits are registered by depressing a small push-button on the end of the blade. In foil, the hit must land on the opponent's lame to be considered on-target. (On-target hits set off coloured lights; off-target hits set off white lights.) At high level foil and épée competitions, grounded conductive pistes are normally laid down to ensure that bouts are not disrupted by accidental hits on the floor. In sabre, an on-target hit is registered whenever a fencer's blade comes into contact with the opponent's lamé jacket, cuff or mask. Off-target hits are not registered at all in sabre. It has been proposed that a similar arrangement (non-registration of off-target hits) be adopted for foil. This proposal is due to be reviewed at the 2007 FIE Congress. In épée the entire body is on-target, so the subject of off-target hits does not arise (unless one counts the hits which miss the opponent entirely and land on an ungrounded section of the floor – needless to say doing so on purpose is considered cheating). Finally the competitors' weapons are always grounded so hits against an opponent's blade or coquille do not register.

In foil and sabre, despite the presence of all the gadgetry, it is still the referee's job to analyze the phrase and, in the case of simultaneous hits, to determine which fencer had the right of way.

=== Criticism of electronic scoring ===
One of the most common criticisms of electronic scoring has been the registration of glancing hits in foil. Traditionally, a valid, "palpable" hit could only be scored, if the point were fixed on the target in such a manner, as would be likely to pierce the skin, had the weapon been sharp. However, the electric foil point (the push-button on the end of the blade) lacks directionality, so hits which arrive at a very high angle of incidence can still register.

==== Flicking ====
In the 1980s, this led to a growing popularity of hits delivered with a whip-like action (commonly known as "the flick"), bending the blade around the opponent's parry. Many saw this as an unacceptable deviation from tradition. In fact, the disputes over the flick grew so bitter that a number of traditionalists advocated (and still continue to advocate) complete abandonment of electronic scoring as something detrimental to fencing as an art.

==== Timing changes ====
In 2004-2005 the FIE brought in rule changes to address concerns over flicking. The dwell time (the length of time the point has to remain depressed in order to register a hit) was increased from 1 millisecond to 15 milliseconds. While this did not eliminate the flick altogether, it made it technically trickier thereby denting its popularity. However, there have been issues with apparently "palpable" hits not registering. Moreover, the imperative to make clear "square-on" hits has led to a number of unforeseen results. The following have been reported:

- Unwillingness to attack, leading to long periods of inactivity and loss of certain visually striking (but risky) maneuvers;
- Loss of popularity of the more sophisticated and technically demanding compound actions;
- A rise in the number of renewed offensive actions (at the expense of counter-ripostes)
- A rise in the number of counterattacks with avoidance (at the expense of ripostes);
- Increased popularity of unorthodox "cowering" on-guard positions among young fencers;
- Bouncing from direct hits on certain protective gear.

The issue of unwillingness to attack was addressed by the FIE with the “Unwillingness to Fight” rule in 2019, which implemented penalties for inactivity and was first used at the Olympics during the 2020 Summer Olympics in Tokyo, Japan. This Unwillingness to Fight rule dictated that when a minute elapses without a point, the fencer who is behind receives a yellow card, and multiple offenses would warrant a red card. The rationale behind this ruling was that directing penalties towards one fencer would grant incentive for the fencer who was behind to play more aggressively, as they had more to lose by playing passively.

In sabre, the inadequacy of existing sensors has made it necessary to dispense with the requirement that a cut must be delivered with either the leading or the reverse edge of the blade and that, once again, it must arrive with sufficient force to have caused an injury had the blade been sharp (but not so forcefully as to injure one's opponent with a blunt weapon.) At present, any contact between the blade and the opponent's target is counted as a valid hit. Some argue that this has reduced sabre to a two-man game of tag; others argue that this has made the game more sophisticated.

The other serious problem in sabre is that of "whip-over." The flexibility of the blades is such that the momentum of a cut can often "whip" the end of the blade around the defender's parry. The low success rate of parries (compared to other weapons) is seen by many as impoverishing the tactical repertory of the weapon. In 2000 the FIE brought in rule changes requiring stiffer blades. This has improved matters but not eradicated the problem altogether. There has been talk of making the sabre guard smaller, in order to make attacks on preparation and counterattacks easier and thus slow down the momentum of the attack, giving the defender more of a chance.

The cutout time is the maximum time allowed by the box between two hits registering as simultaneous (if this time is exceeded, only one light will appear). In épée this time is very short: 40 milliseconds. This means that, so far as human perception is concerned, the hits really do need to arrive at the same instant. In foil and sabre, where priority rules apply, the cutout times are considerably longer (hundreds of milliseconds). This was a source of two problems:

- Double lights are a frequent occurrence, making refereeing difficult. Too many decisions are disputed.
- Once again, the attacker gains an unreasonable advantage. It is possible to execute a long marching attack with only a hint of an arm extension, clearly inviting an attack on preparation, which is then followed by a delayed trompment.

For those reasons, in 2004-2005 the FIE slashed the cut-out times for foil and sabre from 750 milliseconds to 350 milliseconds and from 350 milliseconds to 120 milliseconds respectively. In 2016 the lockout timing for sabre was again modified to increase the lockout time from 120 milliseconds to 170 milliseconds +/- 10ms, while the foil and épée lockout times remained unchanged.

== Techniques ==
=== Bladework ===
The nine classical parries comprise basic bladework. The first parry that most fencers learn is quarte, known commonly as "parry four". Parries are named for the line that they defend from attack: parry four would defend line four, which is the high inside line. Offensive bladework consists of the various means of scoring a touch on an opponent. The straight attack is a direct extension towards valid target. As it is easily defended against, fencers often use numerous feints to deceive their opponent into parrying and then disengage around the blade. As a preparation for an attack, fencers may execute a prise de fer, or attack on the blade. This includes the simple beat, a sharp rap on the opponent's blade, and the more complex bind, in which the fencer forces the opponent's blade to a different line.

=== Footwork ===
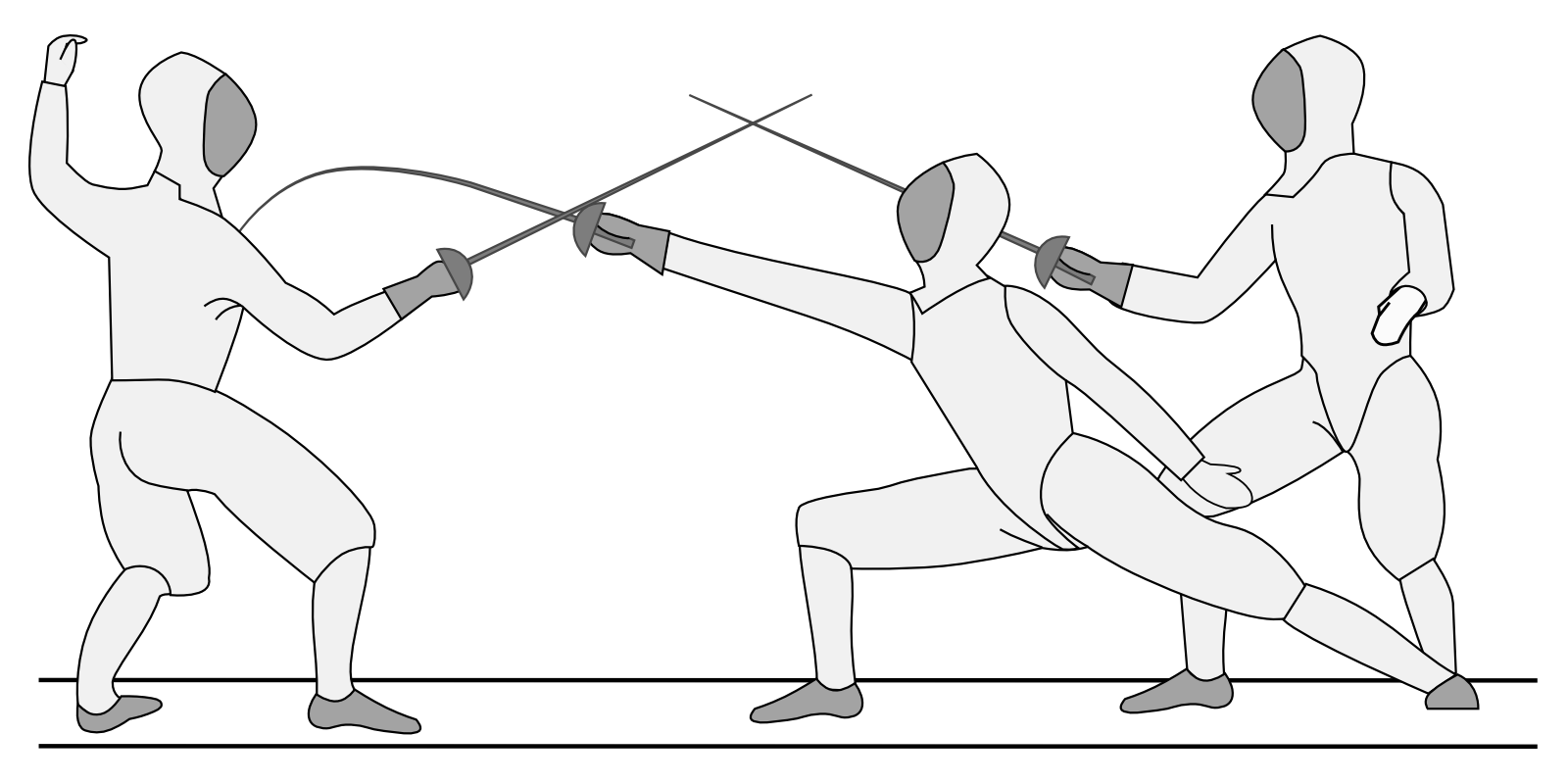
The lunge position on the right, showing how much more distance can be obtained over the en garde stance

In a fencing bout, a great deal depends on being in the right place at the right time. Fencers are constantly maneuvering in and out of each other's range, accelerating, decelerating, changing directions and so on. All this has to be done with minimum effort and maximum grace, which makes footwork arguably the most important aspect of a fencer's training regimen. In contemporary sport fencing defense by footwork usually takes the shape of moving either directly away from your opponent or directly towards them.

The most common way of delivering an attack in fencing is the lunge, where the fencer reaches out with their front foot and straightens their back leg. This maneuver has the advantage of allowing the fencer to maintain balance while covering far more distance than in a single step, yet allowing a return to the defensive stance.

== Competition ==
Fencing tournaments are varied in their format, and there are both individual and team competitions. A tournament may comprise all three weapons, both individual and team, or it may be more specific, such as an Épée Challenge, with individual épée only. As in many sports, men and women compete separately.

=== Individual events ===
Generally, an individual event consists of two parts: the pools, and the direct eliminations.

In the pools, fencers are divided into groups, and every fencer in a pool will have the chance to fence every other fencer once. The size and number of the pools is determined by the number of athletes who have registered for the competition.

Pool bouts are three minutes long, and are fenced to five points. If no fencer reaches five points, then the one with the most points after three minutes wins. Pool results are recorded on a scoresheet, which must be signed by the fencers after their last match. The referee will write down how many points each fencer scored in the bout, although normally if a fencer won with five points a "V" (for victoire) is written down instead of a 5. Losing a pool match does not eliminate a fencer from the tournament.

In some tournaments, there are two rounds of pools, with the second round following the same format, but with pools of different fencers.

After the pools are finished, the direct elimination round starts. Fencers are sorted in a table of some power of 2 (16, 32, 64, etc.) based on how many people are competing. There are rarely exactly the right number of people for this to work out perfectly, so the lowest ranking fencers may be eliminated, or they may be included in the next highest power of 2 with the top fencers receiving a bye.

Once the table size has been chosen, fencers are slotted into the table like this: first place vs. last place, second vs. second last, third vs. third last etc. A fencers place is decided by three factors: their victories divided by matches fenced, their indicator score, which is calculated by the numbers of hits for and against during the pool rounds, and finally their hits scored. If there is no way of separating the fencers beyond these three indicators, then they are considered equal and draw random lots for their place in the table.

The elimination round matches in foil and épée are fenced in three periods of three minutes each. In between each period, there is a one-minute break. Sabre matches are so much faster that the three-minute mark is almost never reached. Therefore, in sabre, when one fencer reaches 8 points, there is a one-minute break.

In all three weapons, the match goes until 15 points. If no one has reached 15 points, then the fencer with the most points wins. The rules for ties are explained above under Protocol. The winner carries on in the tournament, and loser is eliminated.

Fencing is slightly unusual in that no one has to fence for third place. Instead, two bronze medals are given to the losers of the semi-final round. The exception to this is team events at international level, and individual events at the Olympic Games where a 3rd place play-off must be fenced.

=== Team events ===
Team competition involves teams of three fencers. A fourth fencer can be allowed on the team as an alternate, but as soon as the fourth has been subbed in, they cannot leave again. The opposing team must be alerted of this substitution at least one round before it happens.

The modern team competition is similar to the pool round of the individual competition. The fencers from opposing teams will each fence each other once, making for a total of nine matches. At the beginning of the team match, each team fills out one side of a score sheet with the order they will fence in. Teams are not aware of the order their opponents will be fencing in, although the sheet is designed so that no two athletes will fence each other twice.

Matches between teams are three minutes long, or to 5 points, as in the pools. There are important differences, however: each match the score carries over, and the maximum score for each match is increased by 5. The maximum score for each round continues increasing by 5 regardless of how many points were scored in the previous match. Because there are 9 matches, the highest score possible is 45 points. While sabre almost inevitably goes to 45, it is not unusual to see an épée score in the mid to low thirties. If there is a tie at the end of the ninth match, then the usual tie-breaking rules apply, and it is the same two fencers who will do the tie-breaker match.

Team tournaments sometimes use pools and elimination rounds, although given the possible length of a team match (often a half-hour each), this is not so common, and they usually begin in a direct elimination format. The seeding of the teams in this case can be random, or based on the performance of the individual members (if it is a tournament with both), or even based on the results of the same team at other tournaments (for example if it is a national team). Unlike individual tournaments, teams must almost always fence for bronze.

There is also an older team format, no longer in popular use. Under these rules, the teams were still three members each, and still consisted of nine matches round-robin tournament style. However, scores did not carry over. The team to first win 5 matches (a majority) was declared the winner.

== See also ==
- British Fencing Association
- United States Fencing Association
- Outline of fencing
