= Height in sports =

Role of body height in sports

Height, influenced by genetics, nutrition, and the environment, is among one of the main factors that can significantly impact success in certain sports.

== Advantages ==
=== Below average height ===
Advantages for below average height include:

- Greater strength to weight ratio
- Greater power to weight ratio
- Faster rotational capability
- Greater agility
- Greater endurance
- Greater balance and lower centre of gravity
- Lower risk of heat exhaustion
- Less likely to break bones (as they are more dense)
- Less energy required for optimal metabolic functioning; that is, as height increases, calorie requirements increases for optimal metabolic functioning
- Lower weight (significant advantage for sports like Horse racing)

=== Above average height ===
Advantages for above average height include:

- Greater absolute strength
- Greater work capacity (force multiplied by distance)
- Greater work per unit of time (power)
- Greater area for muscle mass distribution, increasing weight
- Greater reach (very important in sports such as basketball and boxing)
- Greater visibility
- Lower resting metabolic rate
- Lower heart rate
- Less likely to become dehydrated
- Longer limbs and shorter torso produce a larger blocking area (important for goalkeepers)
- Longer legs allow for increased stride length
- Muscle mass may increase as height increases; this includes slow twitch muscle fibers (type 1 muscle fibers) and intermediate fibers (type 2 muscle fibers)
- Increased blood volume to deliver oxygen to muscle tissue
- Exercise via sports can cause body temperature to increase; taller people have greater surface area for effective evaporative cooling
- Cardiac output and stroke volume increases with height
- Increased rotational inertia

== Amateur wrestling ==
Height can be both helpful and detrimental in wrestling. Since taller people have more bone mass, they will generally be slightly weaker than shorter people in the same weight class. This difference is made up in part by their longer arms, which allow them to have a longer reach and an easier cradle. Long legs are detrimental in that they can easily be attacked by a lolly. They do, however, assist in performing some actions and positions such as throwing, sprawling to counter a takedown or riding legs. The heights of amateur wrestlers vary greatly with successful athletes being as short as Sushil Kumar at 1.66 m (5 ft 5 1/2 in) and as tall as Alexander Karelin at 1.91 m (6 ft 3 in), though with such variances in height, variances in weight are inevitable so wrestlers within a given weight class will tend to be in the same height range.

== American football ==
A 2014 CNN survey reported the average NFL player was 6 ft 2 in (1.88 m) and weighed 216 lb (98 kg).

In American and Canadian football, a tall quarterback is at an advantage because it is easier for him to see over the heads of large offensive and defensive linemen while he is in the pocket in a passing situation. Peyton Manning and Tom Brady, standing at 6 ft 5 in (1.96 m) and 6 ft 4 in (1.93 m) respectively, are both examples of tall players who are considered to be among the greatest quarterbacks. At 5 ft 9 in (1.75 m), Doug Flutie was initially considered to be too short to become an NFL quarterback despite his Heisman Trophy-winning success at the college level. In addition shorter quarterbacks have an advantage with their lower center of gravity and balance, which means they are better able to duck under a tackle and avoid a sack. According to the former Washington Commanders quarterback Eddie LeBaron, being shorter means you can throw the ball higher instead of a sidearm release, meaning it is harder for the defense to knock it down. Shorter quarterbacks also generally have a quicker release time than taller quarterbacks.

Tall wide receivers have an advantage of being able to reach considerably higher than shorter wide receivers to catch higher thrown passes. Of the flip side shorter receivers are generally quicker and more agile than taller receivers. Of course advantage has limits because exceedingly short receivers' lack of reach may make it harder for QBs to get them the ball while covered, and exceedingly tall receivers may not be agile or fast enough to get open. Tight ends are usually over 6 ft 4 in (1.93 m) because they need greater body mass to be effective blockers and greater height is an advantage for them as receivers, since they run shorter routes based less on speed. By contrast, shorter defensive backs are utilized because of their typically greater agility, as the ability to change directions instantly is a prerequisite for the position.

Offensive and defensive linemen tend to be at least 6 ft 1 in (1.85 m) and are frequently as tall as 6 ft 8 in (2.03 m) to be massive enough to effectively play their positions. However, a handful of the better offensive and defensive linemen are even taller, such as defensive lineman Ed "Too Tall" Jones and offensive linemen Nate Solder, Alejandro Villanueva, and Kolton Miller all being 6 ft 9 in (2.06 m). Height is especially an advantage for defensive linemen, giving them the ability to knock down passes with their outstretched arms.

Short running backs are at an advantage because their shorter stature and lower center of gravity generally makes them harder to tackle effectively. In addition, they can easily "hide" behind large offensive linemen, making it harder for defenders to react at the beginning of a play. Thus, in the National Football League and in National Collegiate Athletic Association Division I football, running backs under 6 ft 0 in (1.83 m) are more common than running backs over 6 ft 3 in (1.91 m). Former Heisman Trophy winner and Pro Football Hall of Famer Barry Sanders, thought by some to be the greatest running back in history, is a classic example of a running back with an extraordinarily low center of gravity, as he stood only 5 ft 8 in (1.73 m).

== Artistic gymnastics ==
In artistic gymnastics, being shorter is an advantage. A lower center of gravity can give an athlete better balance when using gymnastics equipment such as the balance beam and uneven bars. A smaller athlete may also have an easier time manipulating their body in the air. Simone Biles, holder of the record for most medals by a US gymnast, stands 4 ft 8 in (1.42 m) tall.

== Association football ==
In association football, or soccer, a player's height may somewhat determine the position that they play; however, people of all heights have an equal opportunity to excel professionally at the sport. Goalkeepers, centre backs and "target" heading forwards tend to be taller, while players in wide and attacking positions tend to be shorter. A study of the greatest male players in history showed that the distribution of heights approximated the average man and, when also looking at the typical weight distribution, an estimated 95% of the world's population would fall into the body type distribution of great footballers. A sample of reasonably select players from ages 11–18 in the United States tended to approximate the height distribution of the population. However, there is an overwhelming tendency for the 11-most picked players in a squad to be shorter than their teammates, which could suggest a bias in the scouting system.

For wide and attacking positions, the players are generally relatively shorter. Many of the world class players have been shorter than average to average and in many cases gained an advantage from their low centre of gravity. Examples include Lorenzo Insigne, Ryan Fraser, Sebastian Giovinco 1.63 m (5 ft 4 in), Bernard, Ludovic Giuly 1.64 m (5 ft 4 1/2 in), Aaron Lennon, Diego Maradona, Marco Verratti, Shaun Wright-Phillips 1.65 m (5 ft 5 in), Thomas Häßler 1.66 m (5 ft 5 1/2 in), Mathieu Valbuena, Romário 1.67 m (5 ft 5 1/2 in), N'Golo Kanté, Roberto Carlos, Santi Cazorla 1.68 m (5 ft 6 in), Alexis Sánchez, Garrincha, Pedro 1.69 m (5 ft 6 1/2 in), David Silva, Franck Ribéry, Lionel Messi, Paul Scholes, Philipp Lahm, Xavi 1.70 m (5 ft 7 in), Andrés Iniesta 1.71 m (5 ft 7 1/2 in), Dani Alves, Luka Modrić, Philippe Coutinho, Robinho, Sergio Agüero, Zico 1.72 m (5 ft 7 1/2 in), Eden Hazard, Michael Owen, Bobby Charlton and Pelé 1.73 m (5 ft 8 in). However, height is considered advantageous for forwards who aim to score with their heads. Forwards who are particularly noted for their strength in the air include Lacina Traoré 2.03 m (6 ft 8 in), Jan Koller, Nikola Žigić 2.02 m (6 ft 7 1/2 in) and Peter Crouch 2.01 m (6 ft 7 in). Many of the world's best forwards and midfielders are taller than average, while still possessing a high all round level of technical ability, such as Zlatan Ibrahimović 1.95 m (6 ft 5 in), Nemanja Matić 1.94 m (6 ft 4 1/2 in), Luca Toni, Patrick Vieira 1.93 m (6 ft 4 in), Sócrates 1.92 m (6 ft 3 1/2 in), Paul Pogba 1.91 m (6 ft 3 in), Frank Rijkaard, Romelu Lukaku 1.90 m (6 ft 3 in), Sergio Busquets, Yaya Touré 1.89 m (6 ft 2 1/2 in), Didier Drogba, Eric Cantona, Harry Kane, Marco van Basten, Michael Ballack, Ruud Gullit, Ruud van Nistelrooy, Thierry Henry 1.88 m (6 ft 2 in), Pierre-Emerick Aubameyang, Rivaldo 1.87 m (6 ft 1 1/2 in), Fernando Torres and Kaká 1.86 m (6 ft 1 in). Players like Cristiano Ronaldo, Gareth Bale, Robert Lewandowski and Zinedine Zidane 1.85 m (6 ft 1 in), with their height being seen as an advantage for their heading and physical ability, adding to their completeness, are desired for modern top-level forward and midfielder positions.

Height is often an advantage for central defenders, who are assigned to stop forwards from scoring through the air, as exemplified by players like Matej Bagarić 2.02 m (6 ft 7 1/2 in), Per Mertesacker 2.00 m (6 ft 6 1/2 in), Brede Hangeland, Jannik Vestergaard 1.99 m (6 ft 6 1/2 in), Dan Burn, Naldo 1.98 m (6 ft 6 in), Daniel Van Buyten 1.97 m (6 ft 5 1/2 in), Sebastián Coates 1.96 m (6 ft 5 in), Joël Matip 1.95 m (6 ft 5 in), Christoph Metzelder, Gerard Piqué 1.94 m (6 ft 4 1/2 in), Marco Materazzi, Sami Hyypiä, Virgil van Dijk 1.93 m (6 ft 4 in), Jérôme Boateng, Laurent Blanc, Mats Hummels 1.92 m (6 ft 3 1/2 in), Raphaël Varane, Tony Adams 1.91 m (6 ft 3 in), Jaap Stam, Leonardo Bonucci, Nemanja Vidić and Vincent Kompany 1.90 m (6 ft 3 in). There are, however, central defenders who are not of above-average height, such as Héctor Chumpitaz 1.68 m (5 ft 6 in), Daniel Passarella, Iván Córdoba 1.73 m (5 ft 8 in), Javier Mascherano 1.74 m (5 ft 8 1/2 in), Fabio Cannavaro, Franco Baresi 1.76 m (5 ft 9 1/2 in), Roberto Ayala 1.77 m (5 ft 9 1/2 in), Carles Puyol and Gaetano Scirea 1.78 m (5 ft 10 in).

Goalkeepers tend to be taller than average because their greater arm spans and total reach when jumping enable them to cover more of the goal area. Examples of particularly tall goalkeepers include Simon Bloch Jorgensen 2.10 m (6 ft 10 1/2 in), Kristof Van Hout 2.08 m (6 ft 10 in), Vanja Iveša 2.05 m (6 ft 8 1/2 in), Jason Mooney 2.04 m (6 ft 8 1/2 in), Costel Pantilimon 2.03 m (6 ft 8 in), Zeljko Kalac 2.02 m (6 ft 7 1/2 in), Fraser Forster, Goran Blažević, 2.01 m (6 ft 7 in), Andreas Isaksson 2.00 m (6 ft 6 1/2 in), Asmir Begović, Thibaut Courtois 1.99 m (6 ft 6 1/2 in), Maarten Stekelenburg 1.98 m (6 ft 6 in), Edwin van der Sar 1.97 m (6 ft 5 1/2 in), Dida, Diego López, Joe Hart, Petr Čech 1.96 m (6 ft 5 in), Vladimir Stojković and Wojciech Szczęsny 1.95 m (6 ft 5 in). In addition, there are examples of successful goalkeepers who are not significantly taller than average, such as Jorge Campos 1.68 m (5 ft 6 in), František Plánička, Óscar Pérez 1.72 m (5 ft 7 1/2 in), René Higuita 1.76 m (5 ft 9 1/2 in), Gyula Grosics 1.78 m (5 ft 10 in) and Ladislao Mazurkiewicz 1.79 m (5 ft 10 1/2 in).

== Athletics ==
Sedeaud et al. (2014) listed the following mean heights of male track athletes and runners by athletic event.

- Marathon: 171.9 ± 6.28 cm
- 10,000 metres: 172.37 ± 6.44 cm
- 3000 metres: 175.02 ± 6.55 cm
- 400 metres: 182.75 ± 6.24 cm
- 200 metres: 180.99 ± 6.17 cm
- 100 metres: 179.20 ± 5.94 cm

Longer-distance events tend to be dominated by shorter runners, while shorter distances tend to have taller runners, since it is thought that blood circulates more easily around the body in shorter athletes than in taller athletes.

== Australian rules football ==
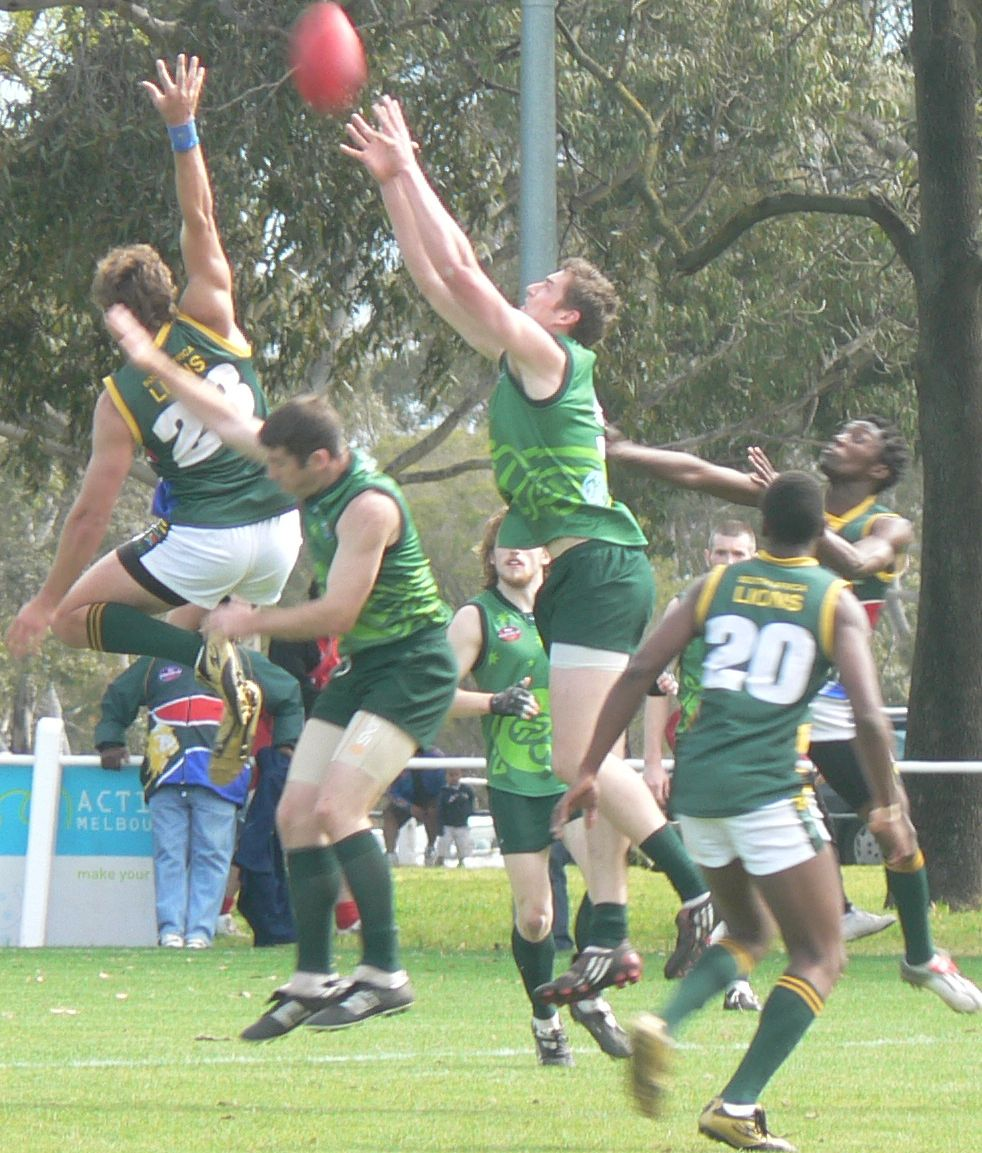
Height helps Australian rules footballers to gain "free kicks" from marking contests, perform ruckwork, as well as key attacking and defensive manoeuvres. Pictured is Irish international Mike Finn (2.00 m (6 ft 6 1/2 in)) taking a contested mark.

In Australian rules, a footballer's height is considered an advantage. This is evidenced by statistics and trends from the professional (Australian Football League) level, including an average player height of 1.88 m (6 ft 2 in) as well as an ongoing trend in the recruitment of tall athletes from other sports, particularly basketball such as Dean Brogan at 2.01 m (6 ft 7 in) and rugby football such as Mike Pyke at 2.00 m (6 ft 6 1/2 in).

In the sport, players frequently compete for possession of the ball above the shoulders. Players gain "free kick"s from a marking, that is, catching the ball in the air from a kick. As such, height combined with a vertical leap ability are advantageous attributes. Long arms assist in marking and ruckwork and defensive spoiling and long legs add leverage for long distance kicking - all key components of the sport.

Each Australian rules football team has at least one ruckman, a specialist position requiring height and leap. Much like basketball centers these players contest first possession of the ball or "hit out" after each goal or when the ball bounces out of the playing arena. At professional AFL level, the average height of ruckmen is over 2.00 m (6 ft 6 1/2 in) tall. In addition, "key position" players also gain significant advantage in height. Attacking key positions such as centre half-forward, such as Lance Franklin at 1.99 m (6 ft 6 1/2 in) and full-forward such as Tom Hawkins at 1.98 m (6 ft 6 in) gain an advantage by being taller than their opponent centre half-back such as Heritier Lumumba at 1.88 m (6 ft 2 in) and full-back such as Mal Michael at 1.90 m (6 ft 3 in) and vice versa.

Shorter players may have an advantage in the "crumbing" role of retrieving the ball from the ground or utilising pace, power and bulk to evade opponents. However taller players may also have these abilities and as such versatile talls (over 1.85 m (6 ft 1 in) for example Trent Cotchin, Chris Judd, Jimmy Bartel, Dustin Martin and Patrick Dangerfield) are often favoured by professional recruiters (such as in the AFL draft) for ball-winning, midfield and crumbing forward (forward pocket) roles that would have in the past been more suited to shorter players.

At 2.11 m (6 ft 11 in) Aaron Sandilands, Mason Cox and Peter Street equal the tallest players to have played in the AFL.

Brownlow medal winners have ranged in height from Tony Liberatore at 1.63 m (5 ft 4 in) to Scott Wynd at 2.01 m (6 ft 7 in). In 2013, professional AFL players ranged 1.73 m (5 ft 8 in) to 2.11 m (6 ft 11 in).

== Baseball ==
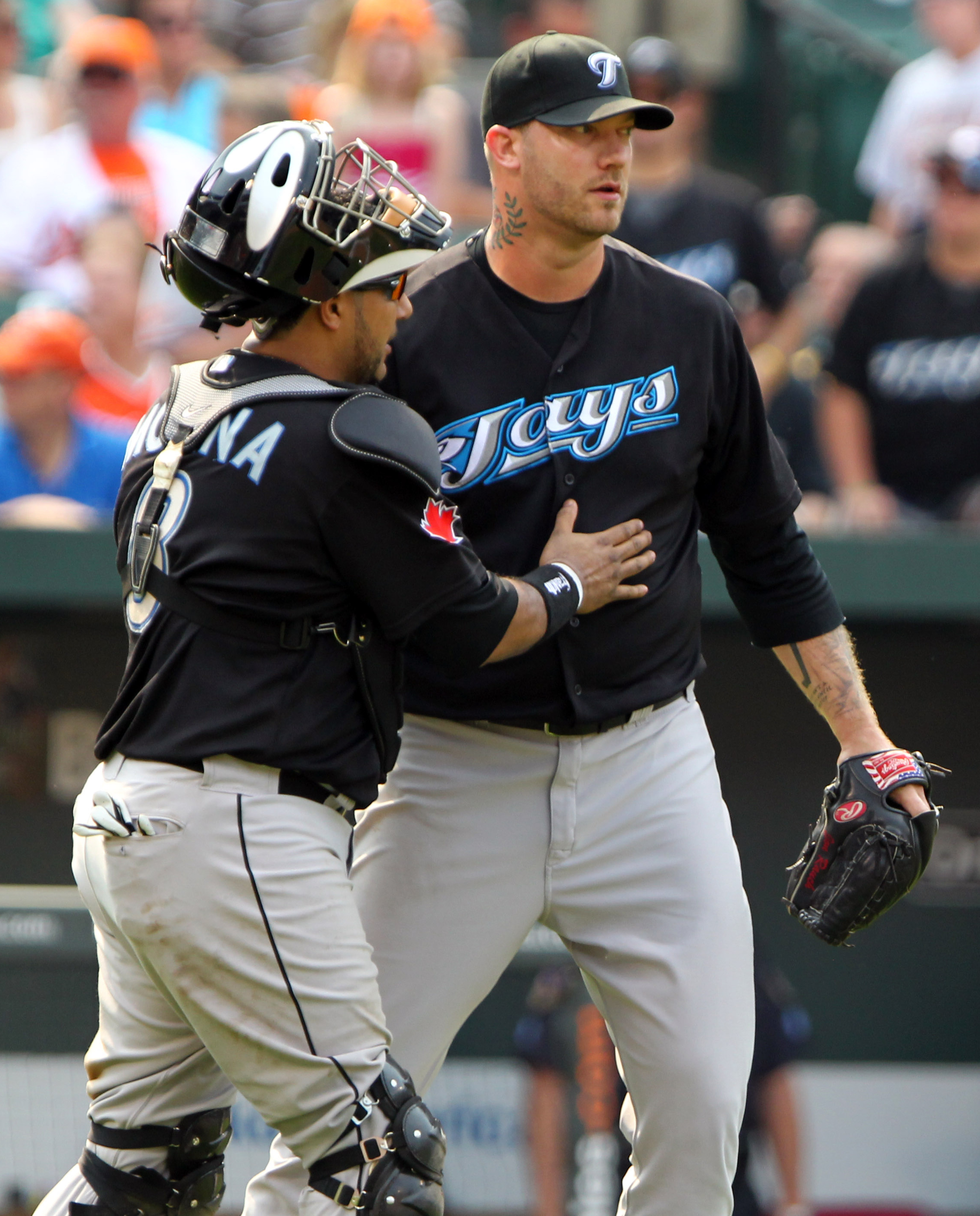
Toronto Blue Jays teammates, 6 ft 0 in (1.83 m) catcher José Molina (left) and 6 ft 11 in (2.11 m) pitcher Jon Rauch, in 2011

In baseball, height is considered especially advantageous for pitchers and they are generally taller than other players. In 2019, the median height of pitchers in Major League Baseball (MLB) was 6 ft 3 in (1.91 m). Pitcher height has increased steadily throughout the history of the league and that increase in size has correlated with an increase in pitch velocity. A 2019 study of MLB pitchers in The Hardball Times suggested that, while height is helpful in increasing spin rate on pitches and inducing swinging strikes, pitchers saw diminishing benefits beyond 6 ft 4 in (1.93 m).

A 2020 study of college baseball pitchers found a significant positive correlation between absolute stride length in the pitching motion and pitch velocity. However, stride length is not necessarily strongly correlated with pitcher height; smaller pitchers are able to compensate for their shorter limbs via mechanical adjustments.

The tallest professional baseball player in history was Loek van Mil, a Dutch pitcher who stood 7 ft 1 in (2.16 m). He played fourteen seasons between Nippon Professional Baseball, Minor League Baseball, the Australian Baseball League and Honkbal Hoofdklasse. The tallest players in MLB history are retired pitcher Jon Rauch and active pitcher Sean Hjelle, both standing at 6 ft 11 in (2.11 m).

In 2019 and 2020, the average size of non-pitchers in MLB, weighted by games started, was 6 ft 0.9 in (1.85 m). Taller players who do not pitch have customarily been assigned to play first base because, according to traditional wisdom, they create larger targets and could stretch farther to receive throws from infielders.

The shortest player in MLB history and the shortest known professional baseball player was Eddie Gaedel, a 3 ft 7 in (1.09 m) dwarf who appeared in a single game for the St. Louis Browns in 1951 as a publicity stunt.

== Basketball ==
Taller players are often thought to have an advantage in basketball because their shots have less distance to travel to the basket, they start closer to the rebound, and their ability to reach higher into the air yields a better chance of blocking shorter players' shots.

Empirically, the over-representation of extremely tall athletes in basketball lends credence to the theory that the sport provides tall players with a very significant advantage. The average American male is 5 ft 9.3 in (1.76 m). Yet, in a 2007–08 player survey, the average player in the National Basketball Association (NBA) was listed at 6 ft 6 in (1.98 m) in shoes.

Players sometimes inflate their height. Prospects may exaggerate their height while in high school or college to make themselves more appealing to coaches and scouts, who prefer taller players. Charles Barkley stated, "I've been measured at 6-5, 6-4 ¾. But I started in college at 6-6." Sportswriter Sam Smith said: "We sort of know the heights, because after camp, the sheet comes out. But you use that height, and the player gets mad. And then you hear from his agent. Or you file your story with the right height, and the copy desk changes it because they have the 'official' N.B.A. media guide, which is wrong. So you sort of go along with the joke."

Players sometimes understate their actual heights to avoid being moved to a different position. One example is Kevin Durant, who was listed at 6 ft 9 in (2.06 m) for the majority of his career, while stating that his actual height is 7 ft 0 in (2.13 m). Durant's reasoning was, "Really, that's the prototypical size for a small forward. Anything taller than that, and they'll start saying, 'Ah, he's a power forward." In 2019, the Brooklyn Nets measured Durant at 6 ft 9.5 in (2.07 m) barefoot. As a result, he is currently listed at 6 ft 10 in (2.08 m). Former MVP Kevin Garnett was listed at 6 ft 11 in (2.11 m) during his career, but is widely accepted to be 7 ft 0 in (2.13 m) tall, stating in a 2007 interview that he was "6 ft 11 and some quarters" tall. Former Los Angeles Lakers player Jerry West was listed as 6 ft 3 in (1.91 m), but has stated that he is 6 ft 4.5 in (1.94 m) instead. It is suggested while usually players overstate height for scouting prospects and other perks, understating heights also serves a benefit in opposing teams underestimating the size of such players if they go by their listed size.

Until the 2019–20 season, the NBA did not have a standard regarding whether players were measured with or without shoes. The NBA Draft Combine, which most players attend before the draft, provided both measurements. Thereafter, a player's team was solely responsible for their listed height, which varied depending on the process selected. The NBA instituted a new measuring standard starting with the 2019–20 season, measuring players without shoes. Due to this change, the height of numerous players declined, from one to three inches, while others grew. Players who had their listed heights revised downwards include, Dwight Howard, Bradley Beal, J.J. Barea, Kemba Walker and numerous others.

== Bodybuilding ==
In bodybuilding, competitors are generally around average height or shorter depending upon class. Heights above 6 ft 0 in (1.83 m) are uncommon in open class bodybuilding and virtually nonexistent in 212, but are common in the classic physique division which emphasizes structure and aesthetics. In open bodybuilding height is often considered a disadvantage due to the fact that smaller bodies are better filled out compared to taller builds at the same weight. However, slightly taller competitors at the Mr. Olympia level tend to have the larger overall body mass and therefore draw the eye. Notable bodybuilders, who have held many titles, are Franco Columbu 5 ft 5 in (1.65 m), Phil Heath 5 ft 9 in (1.75 m), Jay Cutler 5 ft 10 in (1.78 m), Ronnie Coleman 5 ft 11 in (1.80 m) and Arnold Schwarzenegger 6 ft 2 in (1.88 m).

== Cricket ==
In cricket, some past professional batsmen like Donald Bradman 1.73 m (5 ft 8 in), David Warner 1.70 m (5 ft 7 in), Sachin Tendulkar 1.65 m (5 ft 5 in) and Sunil Gavaskar 1.65 m (5 ft 5 in) are below average height. This may be because a smaller body makes for an advantage in footwork and balance. Similarly wicket-keepers have tend to be average height or below. Although there are fewer tall batsmen, the stand-outs are often noted for their heavy hitting and an ability to get a long stride forward to reach a full-length delivery. India's KL Rahul at 1.85 m (6 ft 1 in), Australia's Matthew Hayden at 1.87 m (6 ft 1 1/2 in), West Indies' Chris Gayle at 1.90 m (6 ft 3 in), and England's Kevin Pietersen at 1.93 m (6 ft 4 in) are modern examples of powerful, tall batsman. Past batsmen like Clive Lloyd, VVS Laxman, and Graeme Pollock were well above 1.83 m (6 ft 0 in).

On the other hand, many of the most successful fast bowlers have been well above average height; for example Curtly Ambrose, Courtney Walsh and Joel Garner were all over 1.97 m (6 ft 5 1/2 in) tall. Examples of bowlers well above average in height are Javagal Srinath, Pat Cummins, Shoaib Akhtar, and Wasim Akram who measure 1.91 m (6 ft 3 in), 1.92 m (6 ft 3 1/2 in), 1.83 m (6 ft 0 in), and 1.91 m (6 ft 3 in) respectively. Taller bowlers have access to a higher point of release, making it easier for them to make the ball bounce uncomfortably for a batsman. For extreme pace however, bowlers tend to be around 1.80 m (5 ft 11 in) such as Umesh Yadav, Malcolm Marshall and Jasprit Bumrah thus combining advantage of shorter lever arms for pace generation with good ball release height. Since round arm bowling does not gain much advantage from taller release height, round arm bowlers tend to be shorter such as the classic Lasith Malinga at 1.73 m (5 ft 8 in) and Rashid Khan 1.71 m (5 ft 7 1/2 in). The fastest modern bowlers have ranged from Fidel Edwards 1.73 m (5 ft 8 in) through to Brett Lee at 1.87 m (6 ft 1 1/2 in).

Height does not appear to be an advantage to spin bowling and few international spinners are ever much taller than 1.80 m (5 ft 11 in). Tall spin bowlers like Sulieman Benn 2.01 m (6 ft 7 in) use extra pace and bounce, whereas spin is traditionally about using a looping, plunging trajectory at slow (70–90 km/h or 40–60 mph) speeds. The most successful bowlers ever in Test cricket, Muttiah Muralitharan and Shane Warne are 1.70 m (5 ft 7 in) and 1.83 m (6 ft 0 in) respectively. For extracting steep bounce, height is useful for fast bowlers like Steven Finn 1.98 m (6 ft 6 in) and Boyd Rankin 2.03 m (6 ft 8 in).

There are also all-rounders who are versatile in both batting and bowling. Examples of short all-rounders are Shakib Al Hasan at 1.75 m (5 ft 9 in), Ravindra Jadeja at 1.73 m (5 ft 8 in), and Dwayne Bravo at 1.75 m (5 ft 9 in). There are also tall all rounders like Yuvraj Singh at 1.86 m (6 ft 1 in), Ben Stokes at 1.85 m (6 ft 1 in), and Imad Wasim at 1.87 m (6 ft 1 1/2 in).

== Road Cycling ==
Road cyclists can be of a variety of heights, but it often influences their specialties and roles. Taller cyclists tend to perform better at flat one-day races, such as the cobbled classics, as absolute power is more relevant than power to weight ratio in that context. In the early 2010s such races have been dominated by Tom Boonen 1.92 m (6 ft 3 1/2 in) and Fabian Cancellara 1.86 m (6 ft 1 in).

Smaller cyclists on the other hand perform mountain stages of Grand Tours. Their higher power to weight ratio and endurance are the characteristics needed to perform well in long mountain stages that determine the final standings. Some examples of pure climbers are: Domenico Pozzovivo 1.65 m (5 ft 5 in), Nairo Quintana 1.67 m (5 ft 5 1/2 in), Gilberto Simoni 1.70 m (5 ft 7 in) and Marco Pantani 1.72 m (5 ft 7 1/2 in). It should also be noted that, even though rarer taller riders can be exceptional climbers like Ivan Basso 1.82 m (5 ft 11 1/2 in) and 4-times winner of the Tour de France Chris Froome 1.86 m (6 ft 1 in)

Height does not appear to be too much of a factor in sprinting where tactics and both top power and acceleration are critical. Two of the greatest sprinters in history have been Mario Cipollini 1.89 m (6 ft 2 1/2 in) and Mark Cavendish 1.75 m (5 ft 9 in).

== Fencing ==
In fencing, all the spectrum of height has advantages, although tall people have an edge. Tall people have a greater arm span, which allows one's weapon to reach one's opponent's body from a further distance, mostly affecting their range of Lunge. Another advantage of being tall is that attacks are easier to make more angulated. However, there are also some advantages of being a shorter fencer. Shorter fencers generally have less target area to defend. Furthermore, if footwork abilities are equal, a smaller fencer finds it easier to co-ordinate their footwork when moving in and out of distance than taller opponents due to their lower center of balance. In certain instances they may have a slight advantage when infighting as they can retract and replace their weapon point with more ease.

It is important to remark that tall people height advantage is mitigated in sabre and foil, because those weapons have Right of Way rules. Hitting first does not necessarily result in scoring, as a riposte may take precedence.

Épée, where tall height poses a more distinct advantage, since the entire body is a target and it does not have Right of Way rules. It must be added that regardless of height, all blades have a standard length, therefore the zone of where the point could land to mark is the same for everyone, but as noted before, the range of effectiveness of attacks is superior on tall people. Though, average Europe height 1.77 m (5 ft 9 1/2 in) people are winning Olympics competitions recently. Such as Ruben Limardo 1.75 m (5 ft 9 in) in London, 2012; Park Sang-young 1.77 m (5 ft 9 1/2 in) in Rio, 2016 and Romain Cannone 1.77 m (5 ft 9 1/2 in) in Tokyo, 2020.

Foil has notorious examples of world average height 1.71 m (5 ft 7 1/2 in) fencers who have competed at the highest levels and won significant competitions. Heo Jun 1.68 m (5 ft 6 in), Erwann Le Péchoux 1.70 m (5 ft 7 in), Yuki Ota 1.71 m (5 ft 7 1/2 in) and Valentina Vezzali 1.64 m (5 ft 4 1/2 in) who used her small size and lower centre of gravity to confound taller opponents.

== Horse racing ==
In horse racing, it is a considerable advantage for a jockey to be both short and light. Having a jockey who is of short stature and light weight makes it easier for the horse to run at top speed without being weighed down. At the Kentucky Derby, for example, a jockey cannot exceed 126 pounds, including his equipment. There is no specific height requirement, but due to the weight restrictions, most jockeys stand between 4 ft 10 in (1.47 m) and 5 ft 6 in (1.68 m). Examples of successful jockeys are Frankie Dettori 5 ft 4 in (1.63 m), Calvin Borel 5 ft 4 in (1.63 m), Mario Gutierrez 5 ft 3 in (1.60 m), and Victor Espinoza 5 ft 2 in (1.57 m).

== Ice hockey ==
While the history of the National Hockey League (NHL) is filled with shorter players who achieved greatness (Theoren Fleury, Martin St. Louis), and the highest scorer in NHL history, Wayne Gretzky, is 6 ft 0 in (1.83 m) tall and played at 185 lb (84 kg), the physicality of the game has often put a premium on imposing players, particularly over 1.80 m (5 ft 11 in) tall and over 100 kg (220 lb) (Chris Pronger, Eric Lindros, Mario Lemieux). Taller, bigger players have a longer reach, are able to engage in more aggressive body checking, and have greater leverage for shooting, particularly on a slap shot (examples include Tyler Myers at 6 ft 8 in (2.03 m), and Eric Staal, Joe Thornton, Rick Nash, and Ryan Getzlaf, all at 6 ft 4 in (1.93 m). Since the 2004−2005 lockout, rule changes in the NHL have caused a trend towards more agile styles of play, allowing smaller players (Patrick Kane, Johnny Gaudreau, Tyler Johnson) to use their agility and puck skills to thrive. This has resulted in greater diversity of player heights despite the league maintaining a generally constant average height, while the average player weight has generally decreased. The average height of an NHL player is just over 6 ft 1 in (1.85 m) tall. Zdeno Chára, at 6 ft 9 in (2.06 m), is the tallest player ever to play in the NHL. In recent years, the height of goaltenders has increased as taller goaltenders can cover a larger portion of the goal when on their knees in the butterfly goaltending style. Mikko Koskinen at 6 ft 7 in (2.01 m) is the tallest goaltender currently in the NHL.

== Judo ==
In judo, height can work both ways. The shorter person tends to have an advantage (both offensively and defensively) in hip throws, dropping techniques i.e. drop seoi nage and wrestling style pickups such as ura nage. A low center of gravity allows better position for these throws. Taller players have an advantage in sweeps because they can often use these maneuvers before getting in range of the shorter person's kuzushi. They can also use their long legs to their advantage with many ashi waza techniques and throws with a significance on legs such as uchi mata and harai goshi. In ne waza (groundwork) having shorter limbs makes it more difficult to be submitted but also more difficult to use your legs to escape from hold downs. In contrast being taller can help with escaping hold downs and certain submissions i.e., sangaku jime. The 2013 judo rules somewhat shift or even out the advantages that shorter fighters had by no longer allowing leg grabs and no longer being allowed to prevent your opponent from taking grips.

== Mixed martial arts ==
In mixed martial arts, taller fighters have a distinct advantage in striking, because of their increased range. Shorter fighters on the other hand, tend to be stronger than taller opponents of equal weight and tend to pack a heavier punch. Shorter fighters can have the advantage while grappling defensively, if they are able to navigate their opponent's range. Their lower centre of gravity makes it difficult to take them down with some techniques. Their shorter limbs make it harder to submit them, however this can also be a physical barrier to achieving and applying some leveraged positions. For example, the guard, notwithstanding tactics and technique, generally favours longer limbs although a shorter body is easier to defend. While height is still regarded as an overall advantage, there have been many great fighters who are shorter than average such as Frankie Edgar or José Aldo. Fedor Emilianenko, once widely regarded as the greatest heavyweight fighter in the world, stands no more than 6 ft 0 in (1.83 m) and has defeated opponents mostly taller than him, including most imposing Hong-man Choi, who stands tall at 7 ft 2 in (2.18 m)

== Motorsports ==
In many motorsports shorter stature and lower body weight can be advantageous. Lower height can lower the vehicle's center of gravity and reduce wind resistance. Lower weight can improve its power to weight ratio.

In the 21st century, 21 of the 26 Formula One seasons have been won by competitors shorter than 1.80 m (5 ft 11 in), including 1.71 m (5 ft 7 1/2 in) Fernando Alonso, 1.74 m (5 ft 8 1/2 in) Michael Schumacher and Lewis Hamilton, 1.75 m (5 ft 9 in) Kimi Räikkönen and Sebastian Vettel, 1.77 m (5 ft 9 1/2 in) Lando Norris, and 1.78 m (5 ft 10 in) Nico Rosberg, with the exception of 1.82 m (5 ft 11 1/2 in) Jenson Button and 1.81 m (5 ft 11 1/2 in) Max Verstappen. In 2021, active Formula 1 racing drivers heights range between 1.59 m (5 ft 2 1/2 in) (Tsunoda) and 1.85 m (6 ft 1 in) (Russell and Latifi), with an average of 1.77 m (5 ft 9 1/2 in).

As F1 has strict size regulations for cars, designing cars for shorter drivers is easier. Shorter drivers also tend to be lighter which is seen as an advantage. This advantage has changed from season to season as FIA has altered the rules for the minimum weight of the cars.

== Rowing ==
In rowing, height is advantageous, because the taller a rower is, the longer his or her stroke can potentially be, thus moving the boat more effectively. The average male Olympic rower is 1.92 m (6 ft 3 1/2 in), and the average female Olympic rower is 1.73 m (5 ft 8 in), well over the average height.

However, for the coxswain of the boat, it is advantageous to be shorter since having a lower body mass would contribute to a faster time for the overall crew. Most of the successful Olympic and Paralympic coxswains (Katelin Guregian, Phelan Hill) are shorter in stature and lighter in mass hitting close to the international minimum at 55 kg for both men and women's crews (Both genders have adopted 55 kg by an amendment by FISA to make coxswains gender-neutral on the international level. Previously, coxswains for women's teams had a 45 kg weight minimum).

== Rugby ==
=== Rugby union ===
In rugby union, lineout jumpers, generally locks, are usually the tallest players, as this increases their chance of winning the ball, whereas scrum-halves are usually nearer the average. As examples, current world-class locks RG Snyman who is 2.06 m (6 ft 9 in), Sam Whitelock who is 2.03 m (6 ft 8 in) and Eben Etzebeth who is 2.05 m (6 ft 8 1/2 in). Others include Chris Jack, Paul O'Connell, Richie Gray and Victor Matfield are all at least 1.98 m (6 ft 6 in), while George Gregan, a scrum half who has 139 international appearances with Australia, is 1.73 m (5 ft 8 in).

=== Rugby league ===
Height is not generally seen as an important attribute in rugby league, often with extreme height being a hindrance rather than useful. However, recent tactics of cross-field kicking have resulted in the success of taller outside backs.

A survey of 121 senior player for the Australian Newcastle Knights team, in 2006, found the average player was 182.1 cm (range 169–198 cm), with an average mass of 93 kg (range 73–127 kg)

Fullbacks and halfbacks such as Andrew Johns 1.81 m (5 ft 11 1/2 in), Billy Slater 1.78 m (5 ft 10 in), Brett Hodgson 1.75 m (5 ft 9 in), Cooper Cronk 1.78 m (5 ft 10 in), Darren Lockyer 1.78 m (5 ft 10 in), Hazem El Masri 1.78 m (5 ft 10 in), Johnathan Thurston 1.79 m (5 ft 10 1/2 in), Kurt Gidley 1.78 m (5 ft 10 in), Rhys Wesser 1.75 m (5 ft 9 in) and Scott Prince 1.77 m (5 ft 9 1/2 in) are usually average height due to their speed and agility.

Greg Inglis 1.95 m (6 ft 5 in), Israel Folau 1.94 m (6 ft 4 1/2 in), Shaun Kenny-Dowall 1.94 m (6 ft 4 1/2 in), Mark Gasnier 1.93 m (6 ft 4 in), Jarryd Hayne 1.90 m (6 ft 3 in), Colin Best 1.89 m (6 ft 2 1/2 in), Manu Vatuvei 1.89 m (6 ft 2 1/2 in), Krisnan Inu 1.85 m (6 ft 1 in) and Jason Nightingale 1.83 m (6 ft 0 in) are examples of the trend in taller wingers and centres.

== Sailing ==
When sailing small dinghies (rather than keelboats), the crew hiking or trapezing - essentially hanging off the side - is an important factor in keeping the boat upright and sailing it fast. A tall sailor can get their centre of gravity further out, thus providing more righting moment. For example, in the 470 class, only the crew is on trapeze, so it is beneficial to have a taller crew and a smaller skipper (because the boat requires a light overall weight). Australia's top crew of Mathew Belcher and Malcolm Page exemplify this at 1.73 m (5 ft 8 in) and 1.85 m (6 ft 1 in) respectively.

== Shooting ==
In shooting sports, a shorter shooter can maintain better balance when standing for long periods of time holding a gun, as well as keep their gun steady. Being taller allows for more surface area to develop skeletal muscle; this confers advantages for using heavier guns.

== Sumo ==
Professional sumo wrestlers are required to be at least 1.73 m (5 ft 8 in) tall. Some aspiring sumo athletes have silicone implants added to the tops of their heads to reach the necessary height. The average height for a sumo wrestler is 1.80 m (5 ft 11 in), far above the national average in Japan.

== Swimming ==
Elite swimmers are generally taller than the populations at large, indicating that height confers a competitive advantage. A main factor in swimming is the amount of drag the swimmer has to overcome when swimming. Drag is composed of pressure drag, friction drag, and wave-making resistance.

$$D_{total} = D_{pressure} + D_{friction} + D_{wave-making}$$

The pressure drag is related to cross section size, the friction drag is related to total skin surface (which is generally higher in tall people), and the wave-making drag decreases with body length because a longer body will generally generate less waves due to a decreasing Froude number. Studies have found that total drag does not increase as swimmer height increases, mostly due to the decrease in wave-making drag. Since taller swimmers tend to have bigger muscles and bigger hands and feet to propel them, then they are generally at an advantage. Being tall also influences lung capacity, which is an important factor in swimming.

An example of a tall swimmer is Michael Phelps, at 1.93 m (6 ft 4 in) who won 8 gold medals at the 2008 Olympic Games. The average height of the eight finalists in the 100 meter Freestyle final at the US Olympic Trials was 1.95 m (6 ft 5 in). Another exceptionally tall swimmer is Michael Groß, a German great of the 1980s who is 2.01 m (6 ft 7 in) with an arm span of 2.13 m (7 ft 0 in). Notable exceptions for shorter swimmers, are Japanese Kosuke Kitajima, who at 1.77 m (5 ft 9 1/2 in) is much shorter, and with a more slender build, than a typical Olympic champion swimmer, has achieved astounding results in breaststroke, and Ricardo Prado, a Brazilian medley swimmer of the 1980s, who at 1.68 m (5 ft 6 in) held a world record and a world title for 400 metres medley for a number of years.

== Taekwondo ==
In taekwondo, a taller height gives the advantage of having a longer range and increased chance to strike a target when sparring. However, due to the length of the kicks, combinations and reflexes will not be as quick when compared with a fighter standing at a shorter height. A shorter height will also increase a lower centre of gravity giving a fighter better balance.

== Tennis ==
Height is advantageous to a tennis player as it allows players to create more power when serving as well as giving players a greater arm span, allowing them to get to sharp-angled shots more easily and a greater chance of returning a lobbed shot. However, being tall can have some disadvantages, such as difficulty bending down to reach low volleys or striking shots close to the abdomen, as well as generally slower movement and defensive skills.

Examples of very tall players are Ivo Karlović and Reilly Opelka both 6 ft 11 in (2.11 m), John Isner 6 ft 10 in (2.08 m), Kevin Anderson 6 ft 8 in (2.03 m), Juan Martín del Potro and Marin Čilić both 6 ft 6 in (1.98 m), all known for their powerful serves.

The Big Four all measure above 6 ft 0 in (1.83 m), but not exceedingly in the way to those mentioned prior. Rafael Nadal and Roger Federer both stand 6 ft 1 in (1.85 m), Novak Djokovic 6 ft 2 in (1.88 m), and Andy Murray 6 ft 3 in (1.91 m). Other top greats of the game in the 21st century have been tall players, such as Andy Roddick 6 ft 2 in (1.88 m) and Gustavo Kuerten 6 ft 3 in (1.91 m).

Lindsay Davenport 1.89 m (6 ft 2 1/2 in), Maria Sharapova 1.88 m (6 ft 2 in), Dinara Safina and Venus Williams both 1.85 m (6 ft 1 in) are successful tall players on the women's side.

For both sexes, there have also been some successful players with lesser height, like Billie Jean King 1.64 m (5 ft 4 1/2 in), Justine Henin 1.67 m (5 ft 5 1/2 in), Chris Evert 1.68 m (5 ft 6 in), Pancho Segura 5 ft 6 in (1.68 m), Arantxa Sánchez Vicario 1.69 m (5 ft 6 1/2 in), Rod Laver 5 ft 8 in (1.73 m), and Michael Chang 5 ft 9 in (1.75 m). Shorter players continue to thrive. Present-day examples include Dominika Cibulková 1.60 m (5 ft 3 in), Sara Errani 1.64 m (5 ft 4 1/2 in), Simona Halep 1.68 m (5 ft 6 in), Diego Schwartzman 5 ft 7 in (1.70 m), David Ferrer 5 ft 9 in (1.75 m), Fabio Fognini and Kei Nishikori both 5 ft 10 in (1.78 m). Serena Williams the sister of Venus has been far more successful than her despite being a lot shorter at 1.75 m (5 ft 9 in) (tall for a woman and comparable to the average US man, but not exceptionally tall for her sport) and is the most successful female player in the open era at 23 major titles.

== Volleyball ==
In volleyball, above average height is an advantage, because it would be easier for them to attack or block the ball. Volleyball is a mixture of speed, skills, and tactics, a typical team consist of players of varying height to cater for the specific roles required. The introduction of the libero since 1998 has developed the need for agile and quick-moving players who are generally of a shorter stature than other positions. In professional volleyball, the men's height generally falls between 1.78 m (5 ft 10 in) to 2.10 m (6 ft 10 1/2 in), while for women it ranges between 1.68 m (5 ft 6 in) and 1.95 m (6 ft 5 in). Thus, most of them are above average height.

== Weightlifting ==
In weightlifting, shorter levers are advantageous and taller than average competitors usually compete in the 105 kg (231 lb) + group. Short people also have a lower consumption of ATP and glycogen than a tall person to make the same proportional effort. So at professional level, it is more advantageous to have short stature.
