= Remise =

Remise may refer to:

- Remise (architecture)
- Remise (fencing)
