= Redouble =

Redouble may refer to:

- Redouble, a call in contract bridge
- Redoubling, a use of the doubling cube in backgammon

== See also ==
- Redoublement (fencing)
