= Attack (fencing) =

Offensive movement in fencing

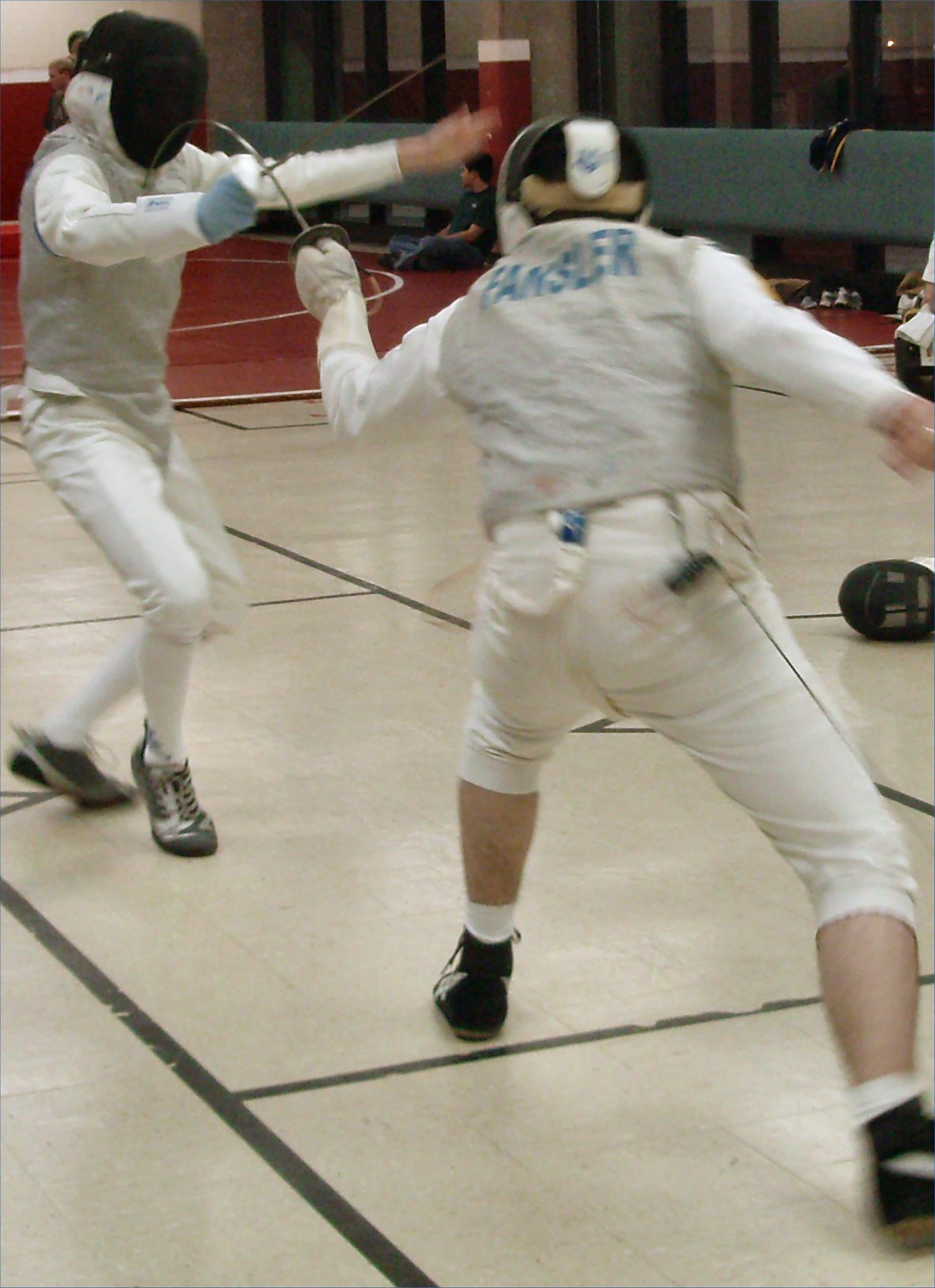
An attack lands in a foil bout

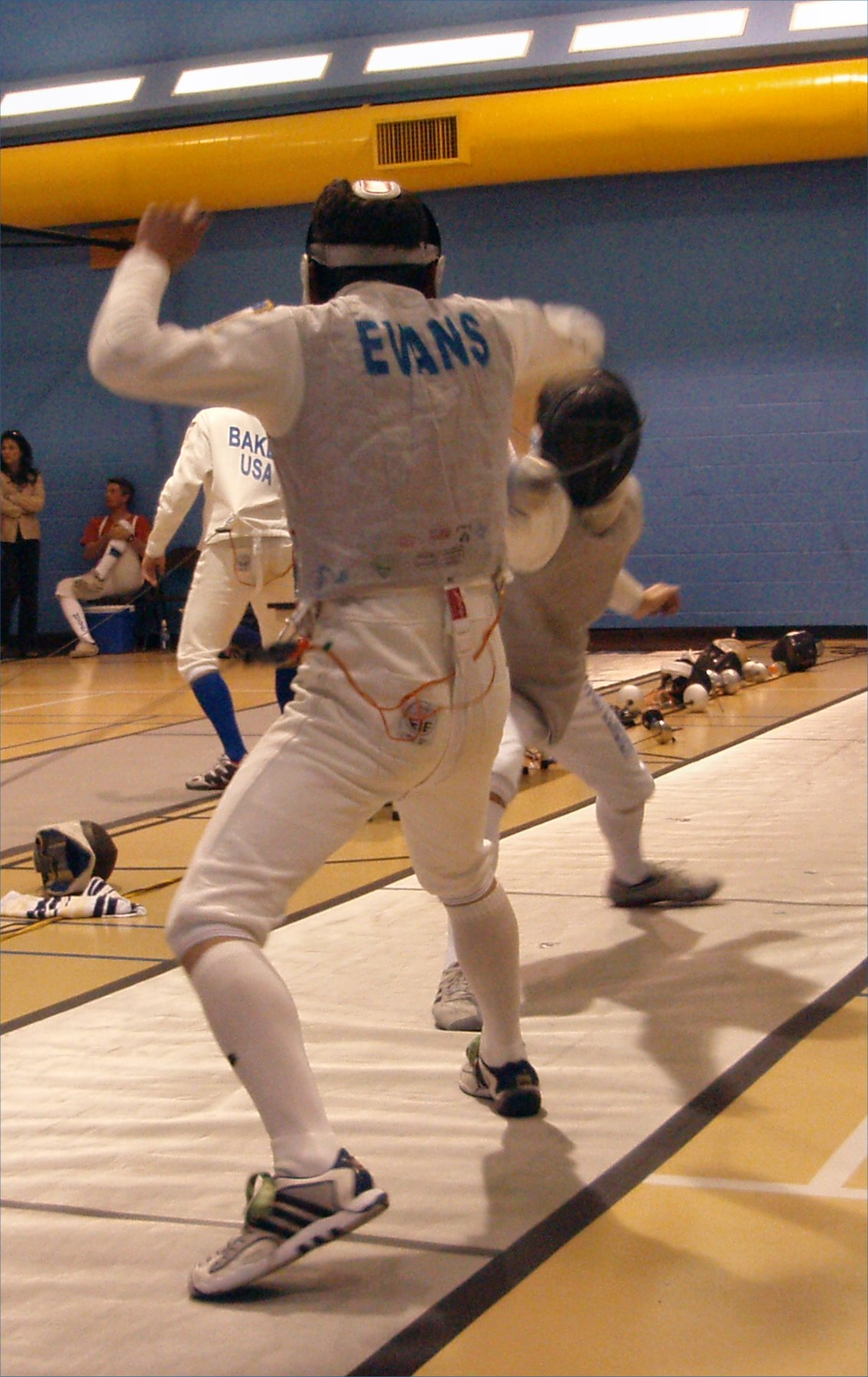
An off target attack

In fencing, an attack is "The attack is the initial offensive action made by extending the arm and continuously threatening the opponent’s target, preceding the launching of the lunge or flèche". In order for an attack to be awarded successfully, the fencer must accelerate their hand towards the target. If the fencer does not accelerate the hand, this is a preparation.

== Tactical significance ==
The purpose of an attack is either to make a hit or to provoke a defensive reaction. In order to do either, the attacker must create a threat. A fencer launches an attack by extending his weapon-carrying arm in such a way that the point threatens the opponent's target area (except in sabre where the blade need not be threatening the target when the arm is extended, the right of way can still be given). The attack may be delivered with the aid of appropriate fencing footwork.

In weapons governed by priority rules (foil and sabre), the attacker gets priority (as a reward for his initiative). He retains this priority until his attack either misses, falls short, is withdrawn, or is parried. In foil, the attack must threaten the opponent's target with the point, while in sabre, an attack may threaten with either the point or the edge of the weapon.

== Classification ==
- Simple attack: An attack executed in a single movement with no overt intention other than to hit the opponent. Simple attacks may be
  - direct: the attackers point or edge proceeds in a straight line to the target;
  - indirect: on its way to the target the attackers blade passes over or under the defender's.
- Compound attack: An attack which includes one or more feints designed to misdirect the opponent's defense. The final motion of a compound attack (which delivers the hit) is called a trompment. To retain priority throughout a compound attack, the attacker must avoid breaking time (see below) or letting his opponent find the blade.
  - Breaking time: Drawing the arm back at the end of a feint (either to avoid a parry or to preserve balance). The attacker's priority is based on the creation of a continuous threat. Retraction of the arm corresponds to a receding threat and, consequently, to loss of priority.
- Attack by prise de fer: the attacker establishes contact with his opponent's blade and maintains control over it, until he makes a hit (if it is a simple attack), or until the opponent commits to a parry (if it is a feint).
- Feint (or second intention) attack: An action which has all the attributes of a real attack (either simple or compound) apart from the intention of hitting the opponent. Feint attacks aim to provoke a specific reaction (such as a parry-riposte or a counterattack), which the attacker can then counteract to his own advantage (to keep with earlier examples, through a planned counter-riposte or counter-time respectively). In other words, one does not attack with the first movement(s) or intention, but, rather, attacks with a second intention, the goal of which is to provoke a specific reaction from the opponent. It is analogous to counter-punching in boxing or martial arts.

Any attack may be prepared by footwork (e.g. a step forward to bring you within range) or by bladework (e.g. a beat intended to upset your opponent's control over his weapon, draw a convenient reaction or confuse him into inactivity). Most elite fencers do not attempt to simply overpower their opponents with speed, but rely on the guile of the second intention to manipulate their opponents, thereby controlling them.

A direct thrust is sometimes known as "foining". (Middle English foinen, from foin, a thrust, from Old French foine, pitchfork, from Latin fuscina, three-pronged fish spear.)
