= Flèche (fencing) =

Fencing technique

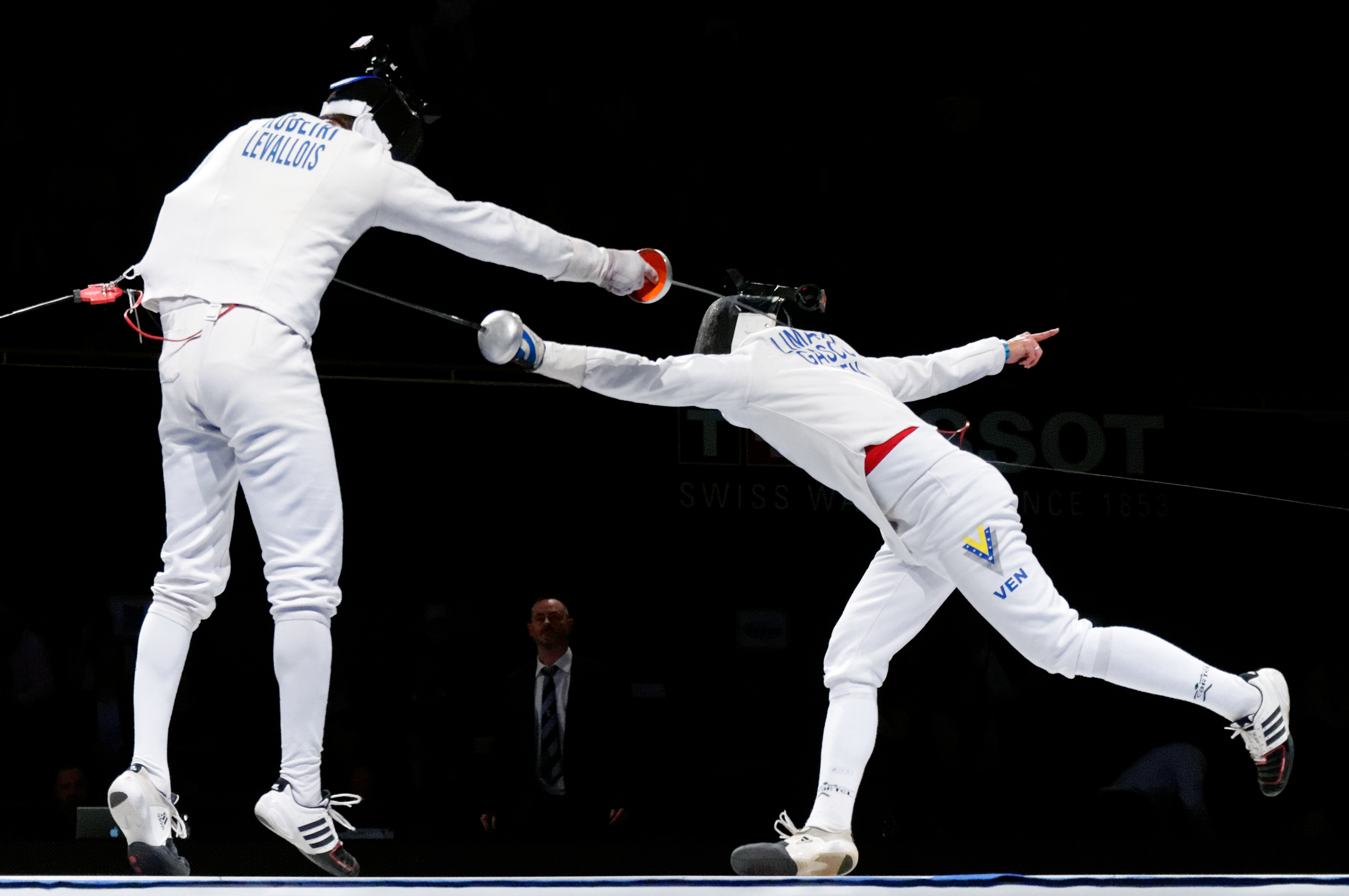
Rubén Limardo attacks Ulrich Robeiri (left) with a flèche, Masters épée 2012

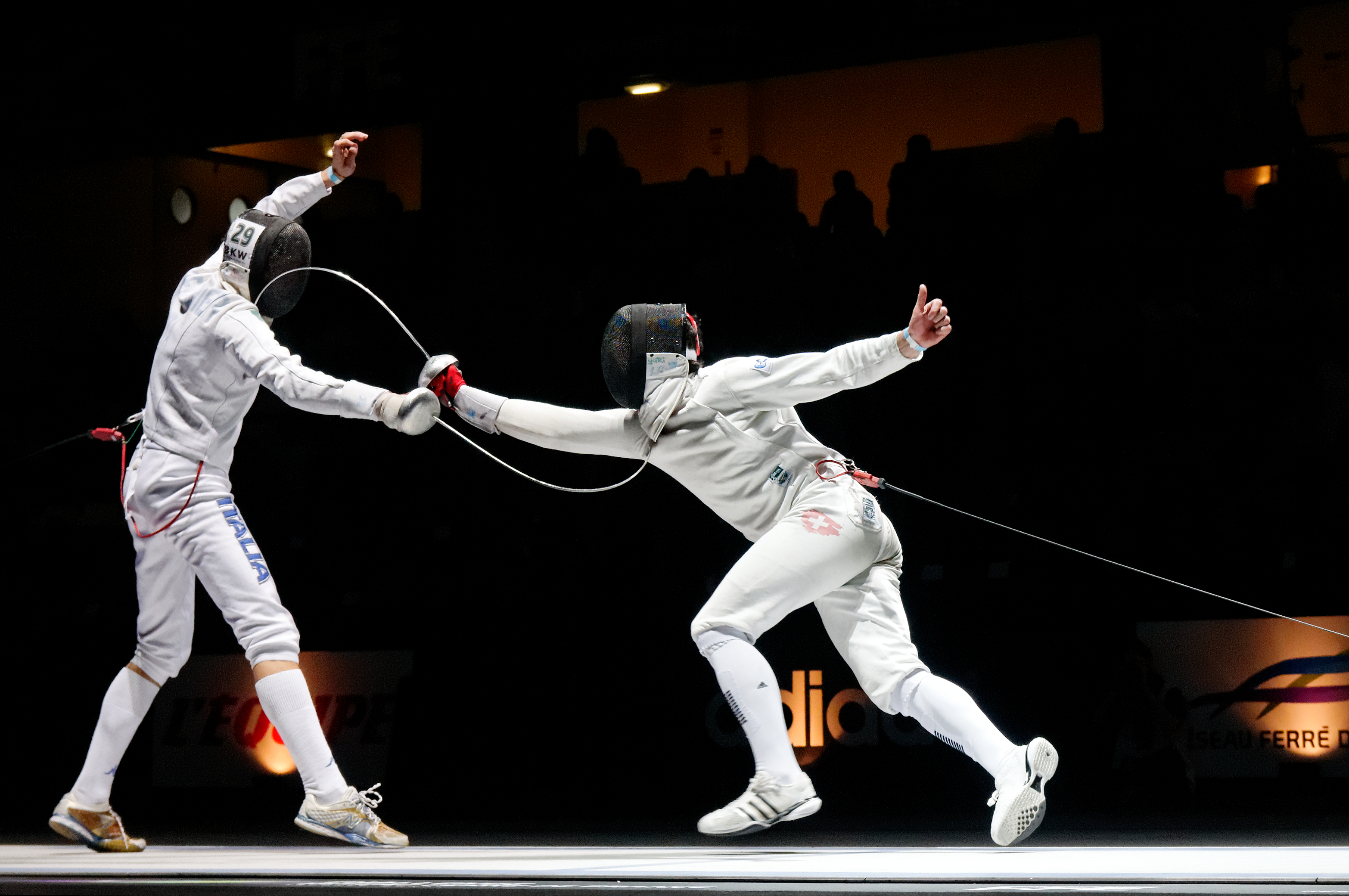
Fabian Kauter (right) hits Diego Confalonieri (left) with a flèche attack, Trophée Monal 2012 (épée)

The flèche /ˈflɛʃ/ is an aggressive attacking technique in fencing, used with foil and épée.

== Background ==
In a flèche, a fencer transfers their weight onto their front foot and starts to extend the arm. The rear leg initiates the attack, but the ball of the leading foot provides the explosive impulse that is needed to drive the fencer toward the opponent. Continuing to bring the weapon, arm, and front shoulder forward, the fencer picks up their back foot, crossing their front leg, and landing it in front of the other foot - as if taking an exaggerated walking stride. It is at this point, when the back foot lands and just after that arm has become fully extended, that the hit should be made. In foil, the attack is considered over when the back foot lands, and the opponent can seize right-of-way by initiating an attack.

After attempting the hit, the fencer continues to move forward, running past their opponent, to avoid the riposte if he or she was parried, or a counterattack. If the fencer moves past as quickly as possible, the opponent generally only has one chance to hit the fleching fencer as they pass. Rules prevent body contact with the opponent in foil. Infraction of the rule may result in a warning, awarding a touch to the opponent, and/or expulsion from the competition. In épée, contact merely results in a stopping of play without penalty, unless it was done with jostling, brutality, or to avoid being hit.

The flèche involves speed and an element of surprise. The flèche is absolutely not a charge down the piste at an opponent at distance. The flèche utilizes timing, not distance, so the distance shouldn't be greater than a step-lunge.

The flèche is only used in foil and épée. In sabre, it is forbidden for the back foot to pass in front of the front foot, outlawing the flèche.

The flèche is not allowed in some types of tournaments, especially in high school fencing. For example, the flèche is forbidden in New Jersey interscholastic fencing.

== History ==
The term flèche is a French term meaning "arrow," referring to the surprising style of the attack. Under FIE rules it is illegal for a sabreur to cross their legs, making the flèche illegal. Sabreurs can instead use a flunge — a portmanteau of flying and lunge — where a lunge (generally cutting to head) is made with a leap to give speed and close the extra distance.
