= Riposte =

Offensive action in fencing

In fencing, a riposte (French for "retort") is an offensive action made right after parrying an attack with the intent of hitting one's opponent.

== In fencing ==
In sabre and foil fencing, priority switches when a parry is successfully executed; the defending fencer then has right of way and may immediately attack with a riposte. The riposte may be direct, or may include compound footwork. If the riposte is delayed, the original attacker's remise gains priority. When a fencer sets up a second-intention attack, the reactions of their opponent must be predicted. A fencer may execute an attack expecting to be parried, preparing to counter-parry and counter-riposte. Riposte is analogous to kaeshi techniques in kendo.

== Other uses ==
In military strategy, André Beaufre defines riposte as the act of striking a vulnerable point of an enemy, forcing them to abandon their own attack. The chosen target must be vital to the enemy or at least highly important, so that it becomes imperative to the enemy to defend it. The objective is to regain the initiative in battle.

In everyday language, riposte is synonymous with retort and describes a quick and witty reply to an argument or insult.
