= Remise (fencing) =

Renewal of an attack in fencing

The remise is a renewal of an attack in fencing. It is performed when one fencer's attack has failed, either because their opponent has parried or they missed. If the attacker immediately continues their attack in the same line, they have executed a remise. The name also is applied to repetitions of other actions which did not initially succeed (remise of the riposte, for example, is a riposte that initially missed but hit in a continuation). The remise is at the bottom of actions in taking priority.

The remise is important in sabre because of two elements: first, that an attack is over when the front foot lands in the lunge. (In theory, all attacks end in a lunge or flèche, and the fleche is forbidden in sabre.) Therefore, if the attacker's front foot lands before their blade hits their opponent, their action is automatically a remise. Also, because any contact between a blade and the opponent's target area will set off the scoring apparatus, many fencers whose attack has failed will keep their arm extended or make a quick second cut to attempt to catch their opponent's arm during their riposte.

In foil, the remise gained some prominence after changes to the electronic scoring apparatus in 2004. The blocking time after registering a hit was reduced from 0.75 seconds to 0.25 seconds, so a fast remise can 'time out' a slow riposte. The contact time required to score a hit was also increased to 15 milliseconds to make flick hits less likely to register. It has been observed that, after these changes, some straight hits are not registered by the apparatus. Thus, a pair of foil fencers may, upon finding their thrust have not landed, remain in a lunge position and repeatedly remise hoping to be the first one to score a touch.

The remise also has a place as a stop-hit, in which a defender (or in this case unsuccessful attacker) hits their opponent one period of "fencing time" before their opponent's attack or riposte arrives. The judgement of "fencing time" is extremely subjective and up to the referee.
