= Priority (fencing) =

Decision criterion used in fencing

Priority or right of way is the decision criterion used in foil and sabre fencing to determine which fencer receives the touch, or point, when both fencers land a hit within the same short time-frame (less than 1 second). After this window, if one fencer had already landed a hit, the electrical scoring apparatus would "lock-out," or designed not to show, an opponent's subsequent hit, and thus the one fencer to land a hit is awarded the touch. In épée fencing, if both fencers land valid hits at the same time, they each receive a point. Because of this, foil and sabre are considered conventional weapons. After a halt, a referee parses what happened into actions, from which it can be determined whether to award a point or not.

== Offensive actions ==
Offensive actions

- Attack – An attempt to hit when the opponent is not already attacking.
- Riposte – An attempt to hit the opponent after a successful parry
  - Counter-Riposte – An attempt to hit the opponent after a riposte was successfully parried

Counter-attacks

- Counter Attack – An attempt to hit when the opponent is already attacking.

Other Offensive Actions

- Redouble/Remise/Reprise - A second attempt to hit after a previous attempt missed or was parried
  - Redouble – an attempt to hit which follows the original attack
  - Remise – an attempt to hit which follows the original attack, without withdrawing the arm,
  - Reprise – a new attack executed immediately after a return to the on-guard position.

== Defensive actions ==
The parry is the defensive action made with the weapon to prevent an offensive action arriving.

== Point in line ==
The point in line position is a specific position in which the fencer's sword arm is kept straight and the point of his weapon continually threatens his opponent's valid target, which gains right-of-way.

== Attacks on the blade ==
A fencer can 'beat' their opponent's blade as a preparation to make an offensive action (as opposed to hitting their blade as a parry to defend against an opponent's action).

== Action priority ==
- An attack has priority over a counter-attack
- A riposte has priority over a redouble/remise/reprise
- An attack made with a beat has priority over an attack made without a beat
- If both fencers make an attack at the same time then neither action has priority and it is considered simultaneous
- A point in line has priority over an offensive action if it was in place before that action started

== Interpretation of priority ==
Despite the simplicity of the underlying principles, priority rules are somewhat convoluted, and their interpretation is a source of much acrimony. Much of this acrimony is centered on the definition of attack. According to the FIE rules, an attack is defined as "the initial offensive action made by extending the arm and continuously threatening the opponent's target...". This is explained in the USFA Fencing Officials Commission FAQ: Initial refers to which fencer starts the action before their opponent does. Offensive indicates moving towards the opponent. Extending indicates that the weapon arm is moving away from the body - right of way does not require a fully extended arm. Continuously indicates that there is no "break" in the attack in which the attacker stops moving forward or holds back their arm. Threatening indicates that the attacker is in advance-lunge distance and close enough to hit, and their weapon's point (for foil) or blade (for sabre) are approaching the opponent's valid target.

The general consensus is that a useful guide is for the referee to look for which fencer's arm starts straightening first. In practice, referees, especially inexperienced ones, may go for the easy option and give priority to whichever fencer happened to be moving forwards. This is technically wrong, but it is far from unusual. There is also a school of thought, subscribed to by a relatively small minority, that priority should be given to the fencer who was the first to straighten their arm fully. This, again, is out of line with the current rules. The adherents argue that this is the more classical way of doing things, but this claim is dubious, as actual practice decades ago based right of way on which fencer started straightening the arm (not which fencer completed the extension); and the reworded rules conform better to actual, traditional practice which was documented in some older editions of the rules.

For example, the 1957 Amateur Fencers League of America (AFLA) rules says

The rules do not require that the attack be made with a fully extended arm; in fact, there are outstanding international champions in foil and sabre who attack without extending the arm fully. However, in all cases, the attacker must clearly take the initiative in combat by threatening the defender's target with a forward movement of the weapon, whether by extension of the arm or a movement of the body or a combination of both. The classical schools of fencing recommend the extension of the arm on the attack because this method simplifies the task of the President of the Jury in many situations, as for example in the case of attacks which deceive the parry (see § 11 below).

An attack which has failed (i.e. has missed or been parried) is no longer an attack. Priority does not automatically pass to the defending fencer, and at the moment an attack is over, neither fencer has priority. Instead, priority is gained by a fencer making an offensive action, as is always the case. If the attack was parried, the defender has the right to make a riposte, but it must be initiated without indecision or delay. Alternatively, they may initiate their own attack if the initial attack missed. The fencer making the original attack may also make a new offensive action, a renewal of the initial attack. If the attacker immediately continues their attack in the same line, it is called a remise.

A parry is a defensive action made with the weapon to prevent an offensive action from landing. In practice, even a light blade contact is often sufficient to prevent an attack from landing, so long as it is not a "mere grazing of the blades" (as expressed in the rules). Therefore, it is not necessary for a parry to "close the line" (an "opposition parry"), though that may be used for tactical purposes. Consequently, foilists often parry with a sharp beating motion which does not necessarily end in a guard position that closes a line. In sabre, according to the FIE rules, "the parry is properly carried out when, before the completion of the attack, it prevents the arrival of that attack by closing the line in which that attack is to finish". In practice, sabre referees tend to look at the point of blade contact: contact of a defender's forte with an attacker's foible is generally counted as a parry, whereas contact of a defender's foible with an attacker's forte is incorrectly executed, and priority stays with the attacker. Some fencers refer to a retreat that makes an attack fall short as a "distance parry", but this is informal use: an actual parry requires blade contact.
