= Parry (fencing) =

Fencing bladework maneuver

A parry is a fencing bladework maneuver intended to deflect or block an incoming attack.

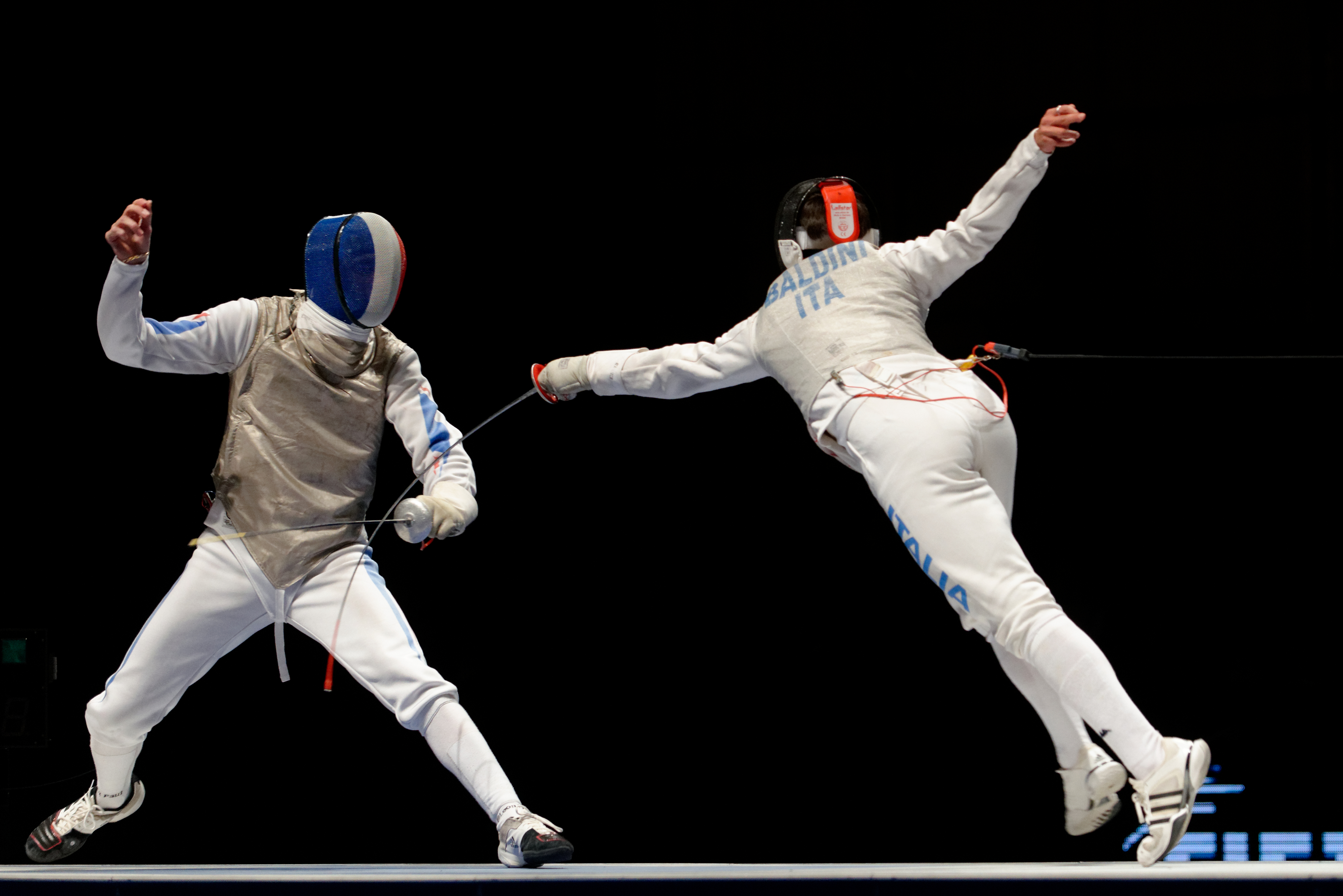
Jérémy Cadot (on the left) parries the flèche attack from Andrea Baldini during the final of the Challenge international de Paris.

== Execution ==
To execute a parry, fencers strike the opponent's foible, or the area near the tip of the blade, with their forte, or the part of the blade near the bell guard (or handle) of the weapon. This deflects the opponent's blade away from them, protecting them and placing them in a good position to strike back. Approximations of the precise parries are made often during bouts, but are usually accurate enough to be classed as parries.

In épée, because of absence of priority rules (see right-of-way), a parry can be classed as any deflection of the blade that prevents the opponent's attack from landing.

== Use ==
The primary function of a parry is to prevent an opponent's attack from landing. During a bout, parries are commenced from the "en garde" (neutral) position, when an opponent's attack is considered threatening.

A parry is usually followed by a riposte, which is an attack back against the original attacker. More advanced fencers can, instead of immediately riposting after successfully taking a parry, initiate a prise de fer ("taking of the blade") in which they move the opponent's blade to a different position and then hit them.

In foil and sabre, the rules governing the parry give it tactical significance as well: there is a rule known as priority, or "right-of-way." The first fencer to commence an attack gains the priority. If the attack results in a successful hit, only the fencer who has the priority is awarded a touch (regardless of whether the fencer without right of way has made a touch). A successful parry causes the attack to fail, and hence the priority is transferred to the defender (who is now the attacker). Taking a parry, therefore, means that the attacker is in an awkward position (with their arm extended and sometimes off-balance), having just committed to attacking, and the defender has the priority, as well as the best position to riposte, or strike after parrying.

== Classification ==
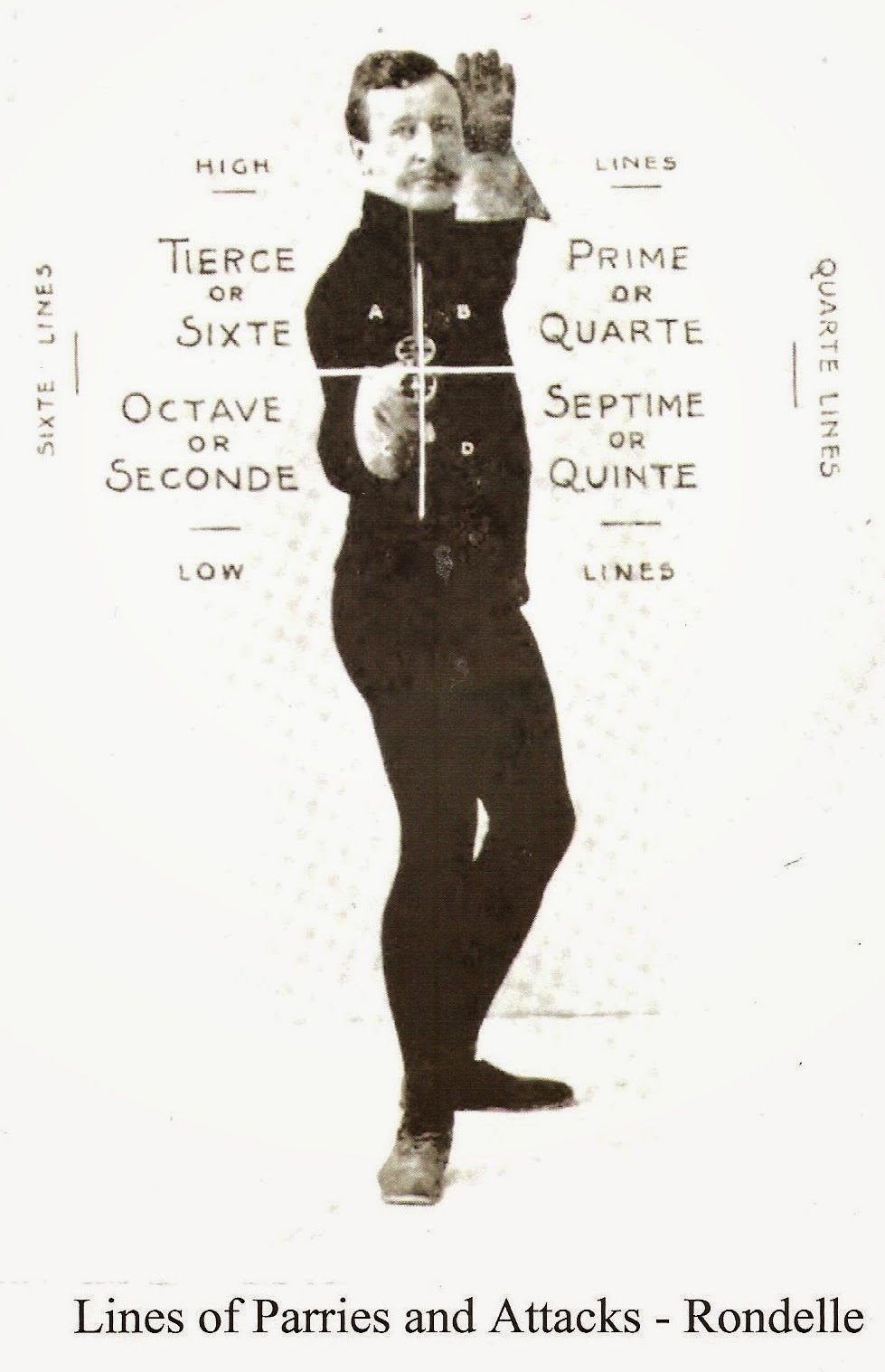
The classical eight lines of parries and attack in foil, according to Rondelle (1892)

There are eight parries in the classical systems of épée and foil fencing. Parries are classified based on three attributes: 1) The direction of the blade in relation to the hand: up or down. 2) The position of the blade in relation to the fencing line: inside or outside. 3) The rotation of the wrist in the hand holding the weapon: supinated (palm up) or pronated (palm down).

The parries are numbered from one to eight, with the numbers often referred to by the old French terms: prime, seconde, tierce, quarte, quinte, sixte, septième, octave.

For a right-handed fencer, the inside line is to the left, and the outside line is to the right; thus the parries prime, quarte, and septime deflect the opponent's blade to the left (inside), while the parries seconde, tierce, sixte, and octave deflect the opponent's blade to the right (outside), as shown.

The phrase "counter-parry" indicates a parry that is done in response to an opponent's parry (that is, to block the riposte which follows up the opponent's parry.) This is not to be confused with the contra- (or "circular") parry, in which a semicircular motion is used to make a parry from the opposite side from the attack.

Because sabre parries defend against both cuts (attacks with the edge) as well as thrusts (attacks with the point), the sabre parries are slightly different from the corresponding épée or foil parries; most notably the parry 5 ("quinte"), which defends against a head cut in sabre (an attack that is not allowed in foil or épée).

Name	Description (foil and épée)	Description (sabre)	Diagram
Prime - Parry 1	Blade down and to the inside, wrist pronated. Sometimes known as the "Looking at your watch" Parry.	Blade points down and "cutting edge" faces away from the fencer's chest side. To stop low-line cut to chest.	Illustration of the prime parry (from Roworth's manual of defense 1798)
Seconde - Parry 2	Blade down and to the outside, wrist pronated.	Arm half-extended laterally, blade pointing forward with downward incline, cutting edge facing away fencer's flank side. To stop low-line cut to flank.	
Tierce - Parry 3	Blade up and to the outside, wrist pronated. Not often used in Foil, and in Épée only as a block to wrist flicks.	Standard en garde but rotated so cutting edge faces further in the flank direction, i.e. guard kept low, sword upright with a slight forward tilt, cutting edge facing 45° to the outside. To stop outside high-line cut to flank or shoulder. Modern sabre rarely uses high tierce (pictured), instead favoring quinte.	The tierce parry in sabre (from Hutton 1889)
Quarte - Parry 4	Blade up and to the inside, wrist supinated. This parry can be Lateral or Circular, as can most all parries. The Contre Parry. The Circular Parry, also known as "Contre Quarte", is a circular or oval shape. It begins in either the neutral or quarte position, and with a twist of the wrist it ends in the carte parry.	Similar to tierce on the chest side or prime flipped upside-down; guard low, cutting edge facing away from chest, sword upright with slight chest-direction tilt. To stop high-line cut to chest.	
Quinte - Parry 5	Blade up and to the inside, wrist pronated. Not often used in Foil or Épée	Blade held up almost horizontally with bent arm, cutting edge facing upward and forward, blade has a slight tilt meaning that the point is higher than the guard. To stop cut to head.	Parry quinte in sabre (from Patten's 1861 manual)
Sixte - Parry 6	Blade up and to the outside, wrist supinated. This parry can be Lateral or Circular. The Lateral Parry is from Quarte to Sixte. The Circular Parry, also known as "Contra Sixte", is a D-shaped parry, dropping the points and bringing it up on the inside bringing your point back towards your En Guard line.	The arm position is a mirror image of quinte (supinated, forearm vertical on the quarte side of the head). Point is diagonal across the body covering the head, but towards the opponent, and slightly upwards (or forwards for a direct riposte in opposition). To stop cut to head. (Rarely or never used in modern sabre)	
Septime - Parry 7	Blade down and to the inside, wrist supinated. Point dropped, the wrist is in the same place as in Quarte. This parry is semi-circular, the point is dropped from Quarte to Septime (or the opposite).	Very similar to Tierce, but the blade is held upside down, with the palm facing and being level with the temple. To stop cut to the flank and back. (Rarely used in modern sabre)	
Octave - Parry 8	Blade down and to the outside, wrist supinated. Point is dropped, the wrist is in the same place as in Sixte. This parry is semi-circular, the point is dropped from Sixte to Octave (or the opposite).	Wrist facing inwards, blade pointing directly down, positioned to cover the same area as low tierce. A parry between sixte and octave was somewhat common in historical sabre, but is no longer used in modern sabre.	
Neuvieme - "Parry 9"	In addition to the eight classic parries, several parries are proposed as "parry nine". It is usually considered a parry that protects the back, point down.		
