= Flick (fencing) =

Technique used in modern fencing

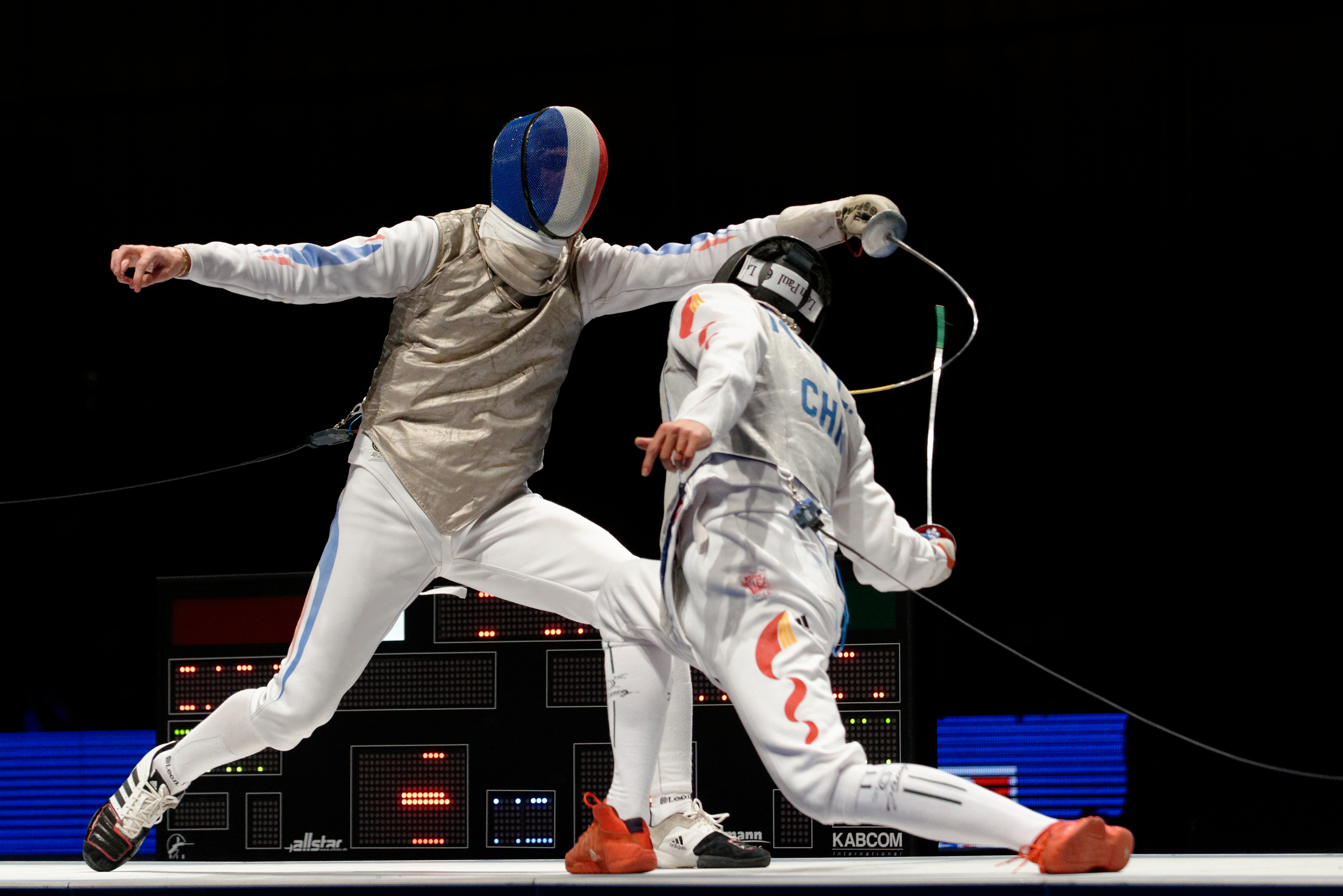
Jérémy Cadot (L) executes a flick against Tao Jiale in the 2013 Challenge International de Paris

The flick is a technique used in modern fencing. It is used in foil and to a lesser extent, épée.

The 1980s saw the widespread use of "flicks" — hits delivered with a whipping motion which bends the blade around the more traditional parries, and makes it possible to touch otherwise inaccessible areas, such as the back of the opponent. This has been regarded by some fencers as an unacceptable departure from the tradition of realistic combat, where only rigid blades would be used, while others feel that the flick adds to the variety of possible attacks and targets, thereby expanding the game of foil.

== Technique ==
The flick consists of an angulated attack with a whipping motion that requires the defender to make a widened parry and exploits the flexibility of the blade. If parried, a properly executed flick whips the attacker's blade around the parry. This is a valid strategy in modern fencing, since any depression of the tip with sufficient force while contacting valid target area constitutes a touch. In pre-modern fencing, judging was done by side judges, so a touch had to land and stick long enough to be reliably counted.

The flick should not be confused with whipover attacks, which occur in sabre when an attack is struck with such force that the blade "whips over" the opponent's blade when parried.

== Consequences ==
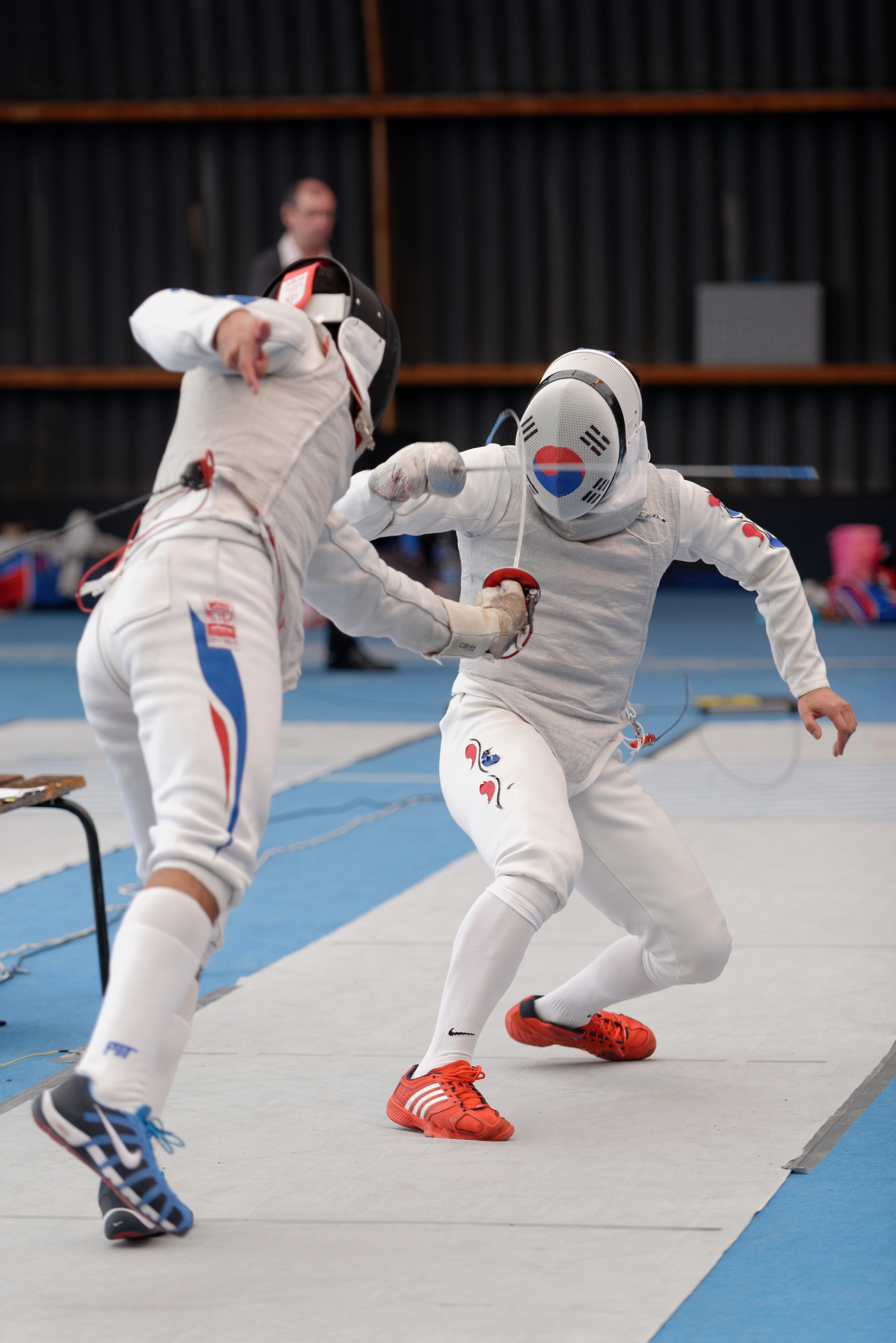
Ghislain Perrier executes a flick against Choi Byung-chul (facing) in the 2013 Challenge Revenu

The advent of the flick, among other factors, has caused the gap between classical and modern fencing to widen. In classical fencing, the touch scored with the flick is seen as cheating, because the fencer has changed the shape of his blade. Also, even most professionals cannot land their flick at every attempt. It takes much practice. If executed properly, a flick can displace the point by bending the blade to such a degree so that the tip of the blade is at angle of almost ninety degrees from the forte of the blade. This significant change allows for an otherwise impossible touch. For these reasons, the flick is the subject of much controversy. As of 2005, timing of fencing equipment has been changed to lengthen the time necessary that the weapon's point is pressed against the target for a valid touch to register. This was done to reduce the use of the flick and encourage the use of more traditional thrusts. This change is widely controversial, as it changes more of the game than just the ability to flick (such as giving fencers the ability to "lock-out" a riposte). Still, though, more skilled fencers have been able to continue using flicks in their tactics, although much less than before.

Ironically, flicks were not entirely an artifact of electronic scoring. In 1896, The Lancet published an account of an early "electric scorer" and claimed among its advantages, that "flicks, or blows, or grazes produce no result." Nevertheless, it is the introduction of electronic scoring to high-level competitive foil in the 1950s that is often blamed for the rise in the flick's popularity. In 2004-2005, in an effort to curtail the use of flicks, the FIE raised the contact time required to trigger the scoring apparatus from 3±2 milliseconds to the current 15±1 milliseconds. This has not made flicks impossible, but it has made them more technically demanding, as glancing hits no longer register, and it is essential that the point arrives more or less square-on. Before the rule was changed, the blade could bend more easily so the back and flanks were easier to hit and score.

2005 Timing Specifications: The new 2005 timings have increased the Impact Time from 1-5 ms to 13-15 ms, and decreased the Blocking Time from 750 +/-50 ms to 300 +/-25 ms. Thus, the blocking time has been effectively halved. This leads to situations (described above) where a riposte is "locked out". 'Lock-out' refers to the mechanism of the electronic scoring system which disallows additional touches after a certain margin of time after the first hit.
