= Lunge (fencing) =

Attacking technique in fencing

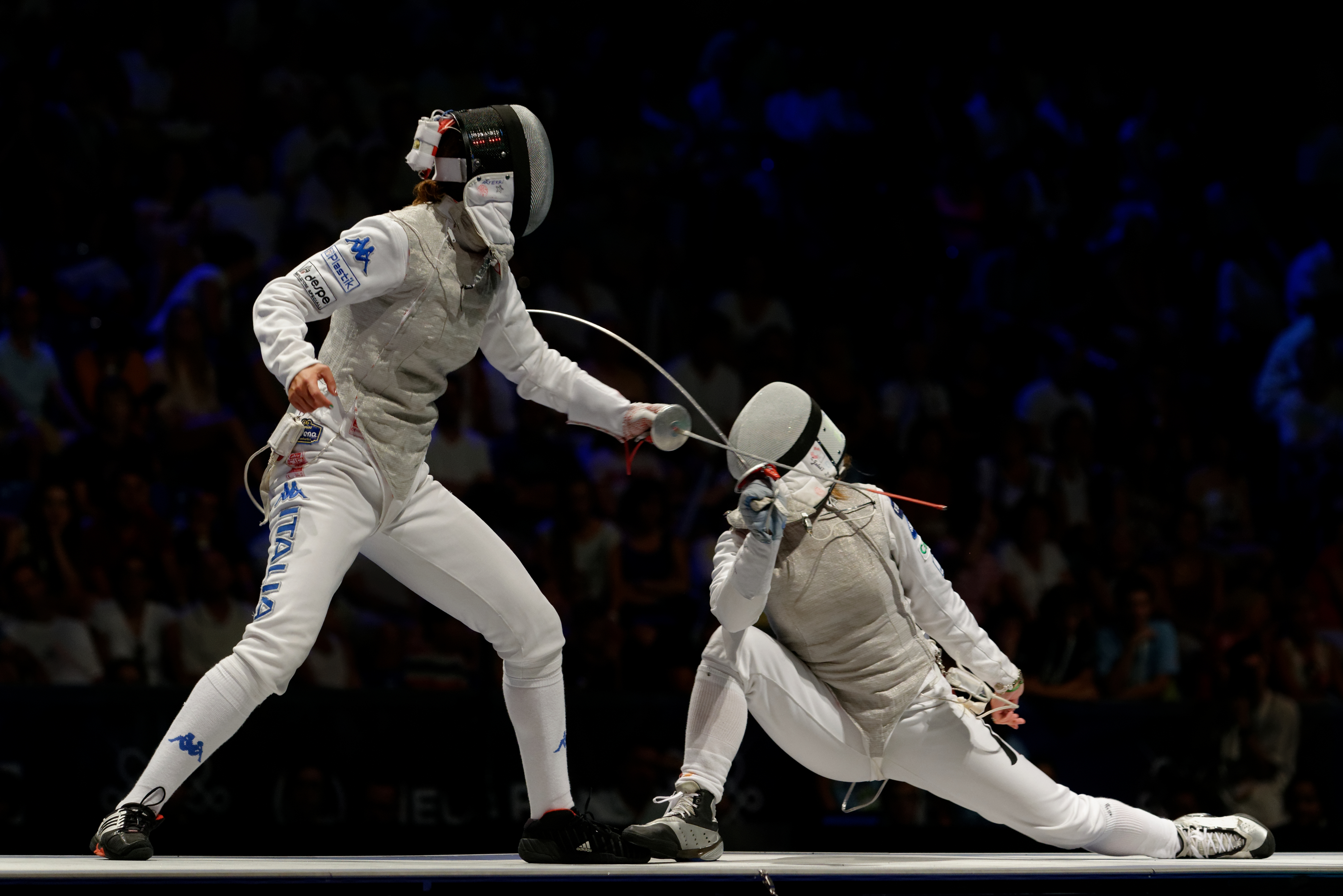
Carolin Golubytskyi (R) executes a lunge as Arianna Errigo parries, final of the women's foil in the 2013 World Fencing Championships.

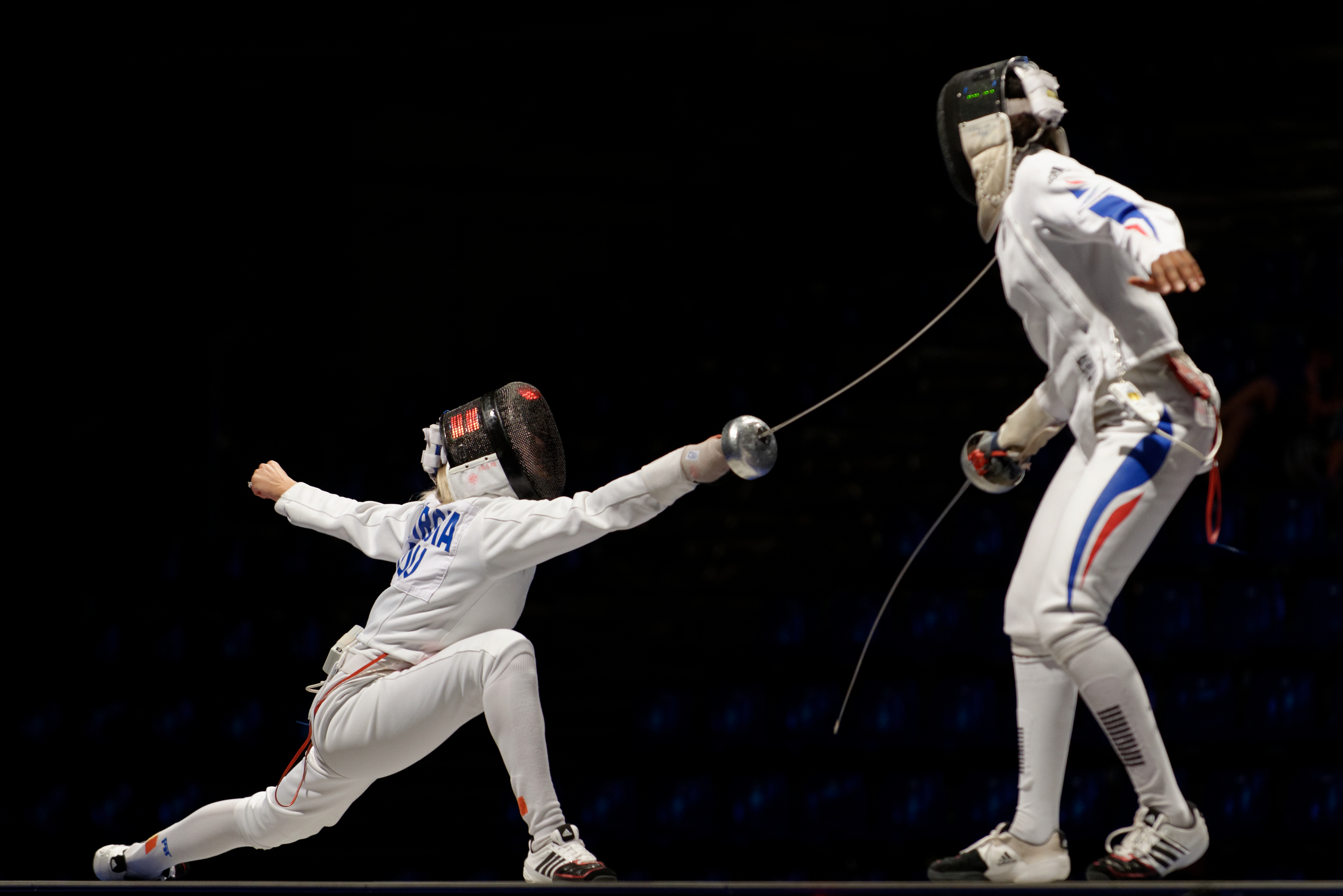
Raluca Cristina Sbârcia lunges at Joséphine Jacques-André-Coquin, women's épée event of the 2013 World Fencing Championships.

The lunge is the fundamental footwork technique used with all three fencing weapons: foil, épée and sabre. It is common to all contemporary fencing styles.

The lunge is executed by kicking forward with the front foot, and pushing the body forward with the back leg. It can be used in combination with different blade work to deliver an offensive action such as an attack.

The lunge is one of the most basic and most common types of offensive footwork.

== Relation to the attack ==
The lunge is often used to deliver an attack. In sabre, the end of the attack is defined by the front foot of the lunge landing on the piste. An attack can be made with a lunge on its own, or can be made with a step-forward-lunge, which are both considered single tempo actions.

== History ==
The characteristic motion of the modern lunge traces its ancestry to European swordplay of the 16th and 17th centuries. Scholars of fence such as Egerton Castle attribute the first true lunging attack to Angelo Viggiani and his Lo Schermo of 1575 (the punta supramano, or "overhand thrust"). A simple advance or pass during the thrusting attack is common as early as the Royal Armouries Ms. I.33, roughly dated to the mid-14th century.

== See also ==
- Lunge (exercise)
- Partial squat
