= Sabre (fencing) =

Weapon and type of modern fencing

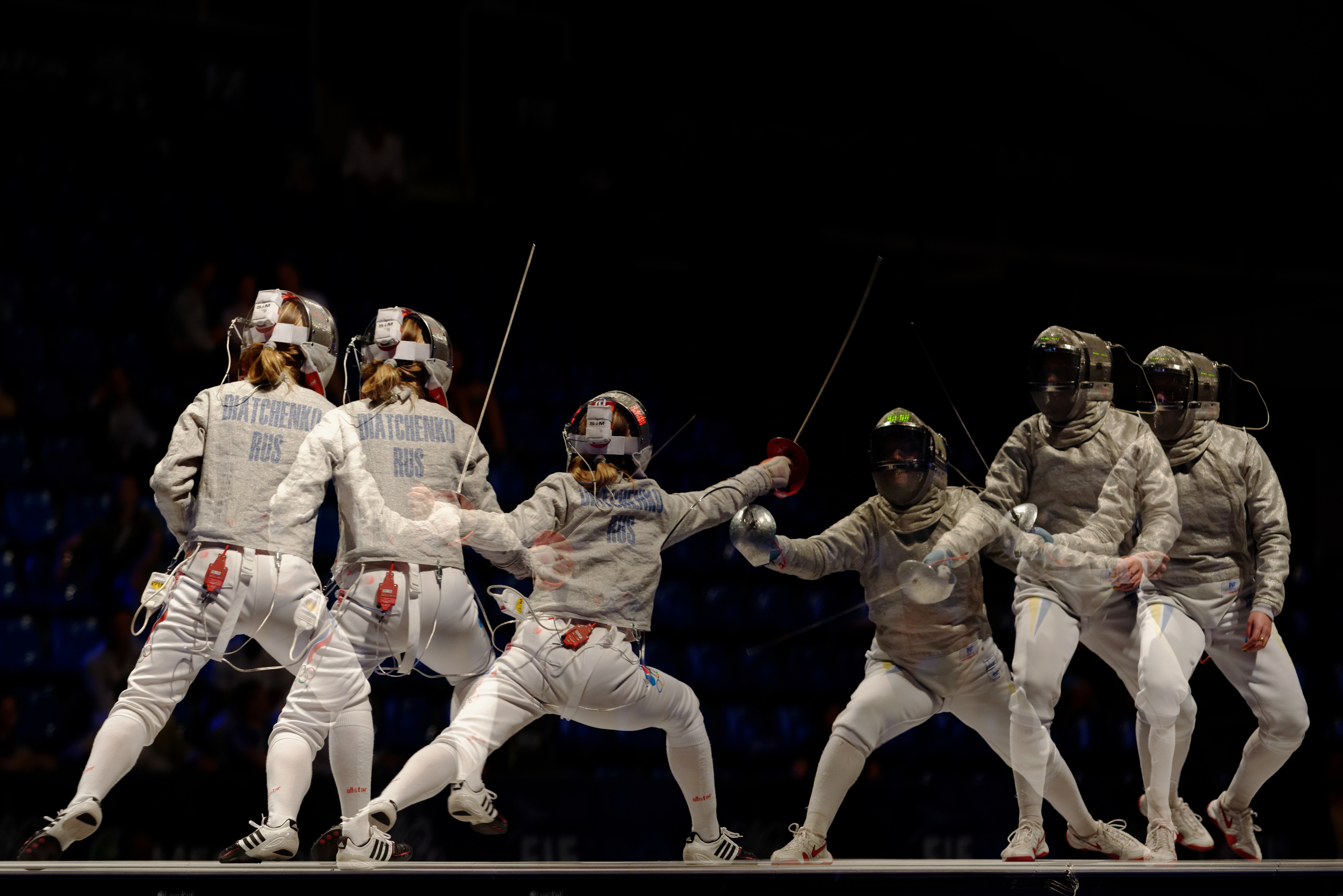
Olena Voronina scores a hit off Yekaterina Dyachenko (L) in the women's team sabre final of the 2013 World Fencing Championships

The sabre (US English: saber, both pronounced /ˈseɪbər/) is one of the three disciplines of modern fencing alongside foil and epee. The sabre weapon is for thrusting and cutting with both the cutting edge and the back of the blade (unlike the other modern fencing weapons, the épée and foil, where a touch is scored only using the point of the blade).

The informal term sabre fencer refers to sabre fencers of both genders.

== Weapon ==
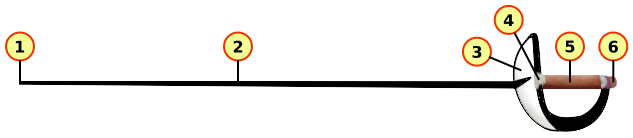
1. "Tip"; 2. Steel blade; 3. Bell guard; 4. Electrical socket (electrical sabre only); 5. Handle / grip; 6. Insulating pommel

Specifications of the sabre apparatus
Name		Description	FIE regulated
Guard	17 cm × 14 cm × 15 cm (6.7 in × 5.5 in × 5.9 in)	Maximum section; protects the fencer's hand.	Yes
Blade	88 cm (35 in)	The blade attached into the handle, steel	Yes
Total length	105 cm (41 in)	Total maximum the dimension of the sabre	Yes
Total weight	500 g (18 oz)	Total maximum weight ready for use	Yes

"The blade, which must be of steel, is approximately rectangular in section. The maximum length of the blade is 88 cm (35 in). The minimum width of the blade, which must be at the button, is 4 mm (0.16 in); its thickness, also immediately below the button, must be at least 1.2 mm (0.047 in)."

The cross-sectional profile of the sabre blade is commonly a V-shaped base which transitions to a flat rectangular shaped end with most blade variants, but this is dependent on how it is manufactured. This allows the blade to be flexible towards the end. According to regulation, manufacturers must acknowledge that the blade must be fixed horizontally at a point 70 cm (28 in) from the tip of the blade.

Standardised adult (size 5) blades are 88 cm (35 in) in length (excluding other components). At the end of the blade, the point is folded over itself to form a "button" which, when viewed end on, must have a square or rectangular section of 4–6 mm (0.16–0.24 in) no larger or smaller. The button must not be any more than 3 mm (0.12 in) from the end of the 88 cm (35 in) blade section.

The guard is full in shape, made in one piece and is externally smooth; the curvature of the guard is continuous without any aesthetic perforations or rims. The interior of the guard is fully insulated by either paint or a pad. The guard is designed to provide the hand adequate protection to ensure that injury does not occur which may hinder the performance of the fencer. Guards are dimensionally measured 15 by 14 cm (5.9 by 5.5 in) in section where the blade is parallel with the axis of the gauge.

On electrical sabres, a socket for the body wire is found underneath the bell guard. A fastener known as a pommel is attached to the end of the sword to keep the bell guard and handle on. It electrically separates the handle and the guard.

The conventional handle of the sabre is shaped so that it may be held so that the hand may slide down to gain further extension of the weapon relative to the fencer. Other grips which form various shapes are incompatible and impractical with sabre as they limit the movement of the hand, and are likely to be ergonomically incompatible with the guard.

The entire weapon is generally 105 cm (41 in) long; the maximum weight is 500 g (18 oz), but most competition swords are closer to 400 g (14 oz). It is shorter than the foil or épée, and lighter than the épée, hence physically easier to move swiftly and decisively. However the integrity of the sabre blade is not as strong as other weapons as it is more likely to break due to the design.

=== Electrical sabre ===
Like other weapons used in fencing, the modern sabre uses an electrical connection to register touches. The sabreur wears a lamé, a conductive jacket, to complete the circuit and register a touch to a valid target.

Sabre was the last weapon in fencing to make the transition over to using electrical equipment. This occurred in 1988, 32 years (1956) after the foil and 52 years (1936) after the épée. In 2004, immediately following the Athens Summer Olympics, the timing for recording a touch was shortened from its previous setting, dramatically altering the sport and method in which a touch is scored.

Unlike the other two weapons, there is very little difference between an electric sabre and a steam or dry (non-electric) one. The blade itself is the same in steam and electric sabres, as there is no need for a blade wire or pressure-sensitive tip in an electric sabre. An electric sabre has a socket, which is generally a 2-prong or bayonet foil socket with the two contacts shorted together. The electric sabre also has insulation on the pommel and on the inside of the guard to prevent an electrical connection between the sabre and the lamé. This is undesirable because it effectively extends the lamé onto the sabre, causing any blade contact to be registered as a valid touch.

Early electric sabres were equipped with a capteur socket. The capteur was a small mechanical accelerometer that was intended to distinguish between a good cut and a mere touch of the blade against the target. In November 2019, the FIE announced their intention to re-introduce the capteur to sabre using modern accelerometer technology.

== Target area ==
Valid target area for hits to be scored indicated in red.

The general target area for the discipline, that is, all areas where a valid hit may be scored, comprises the entire torso above the waist, the head, and the arms up to the wrist. The legs, hands and feet are excluded from the target area.

A single circuit for the entire target area used in scoring systems is formed by multiple conductive pieces of equipment:

- Glove: Gloves usually provide the conductive manchette (cuff) used in physical conjunction and contact with the lamé; usually worn over the lamé. The hand may not be conductive.
- Lamé: The conductive lamé which covers the torso and arms of the fencer. Conductivity of the lamé does not extend past the waistline to comply with the target criteria. The lamé is connected to the sabre by a body cord which features a 3-pin plug (which connects to the box via the strip's floor reel), crocodile clip (which connects to the lamé) and 2-pin plug (which connects to the sabre).
- Mask: The conductive mask, usually directly connected to the lamé through a mask wire with a crocodile clip on each end.

Because touches can be scored using the edge of the blade, there is no need for a pressure-sensitive head (the "button") to be present on the end of the blade. When fencing "electric" (as opposed to "steam" or "dry") a current runs through the sabre blade. When the blade comes into contact with the lamé, the electrical mask, or the manchette, current flows through the body cord and interacts with the scoring equipment.

== Scoring ==
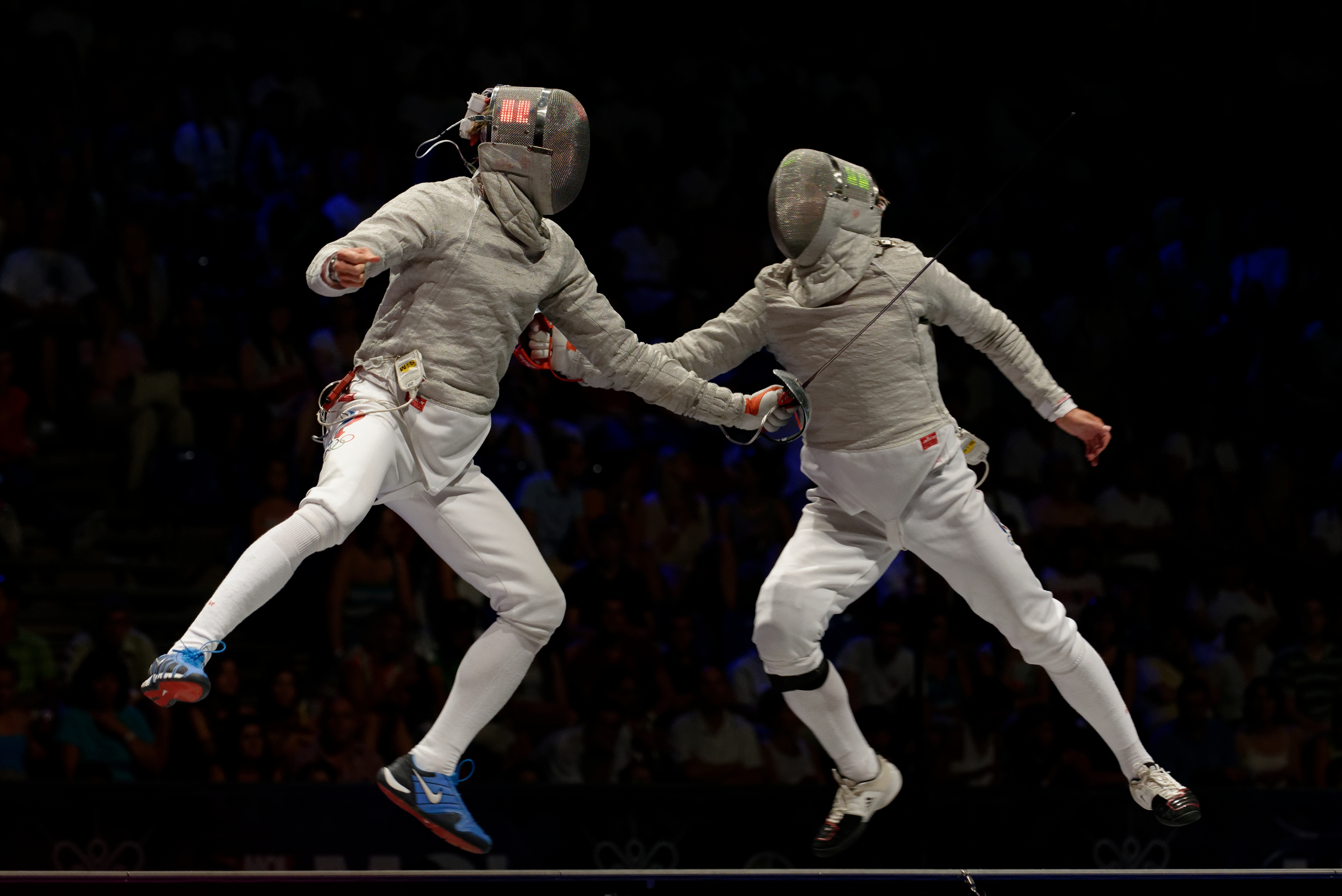
Veniamin Reshetnikov (Left) and Nikolay Kovalev (Right) hit each other simultaneously: both lights on the masks are on. Final of the 2013 World Fencing Championships.

=== Central judging apparatus ===
The scoring apparatus or box aids the referee's final judgement. As for all electrical apparatus used in modern fencing, the referee must take into account the possibility of mechanical failure. Most sabre hits are registered by light signals placed on top of the sabre apparatus (red and green distinguishable for each fencer, with the light indicating the fencer who registered a hit) and accompanied by audible signal(s) consisting of either a short ring or a continuous note limited to two seconds.

In some circumstances a white signal is indicated when a fencer has hit off-target.

==== Lockout period ====
The lockout period is the minimum amount of time between registered touches respective of the target area. This period is set into the electrical apparatus to aid judgement.

Recent regulation adjustments to the "functioning times of the scoring apparatuses" following from the 2016 Olympic Games modified the registering times from 120 ms (± 10 ms) to 170 ms (± 10 ms). Scoring apparatuses with the new modification are marked with a 2 cm × 4 cm (0.79 in × 1.57 in) magenta identification label bearing in black text "FIE 2016".

- If both hits occur and the time difference is greater than the lockout period, one signal is displayed by the judging apparatus. The referee is likely to award the point to the first hit.
- If both hits occur within the lockout period, both signals are displayed; in such a situation final judgement of the score is determined by the 'right of way'.

Changing the lockout timing effectively changed the way with which the sabre was fenced, making it faster with greater emphasis on footwork. Although the essential nature of the game would remain the same, the strategies for attack and defense would need to be rethought.

The timing change was initially greeted with a degree of controversy, as many fencers were accustomed to having the longer timings. This made the techniques then employed vulnerable to fast stop-cuts (a hit made by the defender that lands whilst the attacker is still beginning an attack, also known as a skyhook) or remises (a second attack made by the original attacker after the first has technically finished). It was commonly regarded that the shorter timings would only encourage poor technique and an "attack only" mentality, negating much of the art of the sport.

Remises and stop-cuts would not normally score a point, as a hit by the attacker would take priority. However, the hit made with priority may arrive too late under the shorter timings to register, and so the stop-cuts and remises would indeed score.

As a result of the narrower timings, the efficacy of attacks into preparation was increased, meaning that it was now more critical that the preparing fencer must already have begun an attack by the time the two fencers were in hitting distance of each other.

The techniques of how to parry and riposte have been extended. The solid parries, used extensively before the change of timings, would be supplemented by an additional step back by the defender to avoid the attacker remising (continuing to push their blade after their attack has technically done) or else the defence to be performed as a beat-attack, an extending arm that deflects the oncoming attack halfway through the extension before hitting the original attacker's target area.

With hindsight, the shorter timings seem to have encouraged a tightening and refinement of the original techniques with smaller, neater moves so that, on the whole, sabre fencing became faster and more precise than it had ever been before.

=== Right of way ===
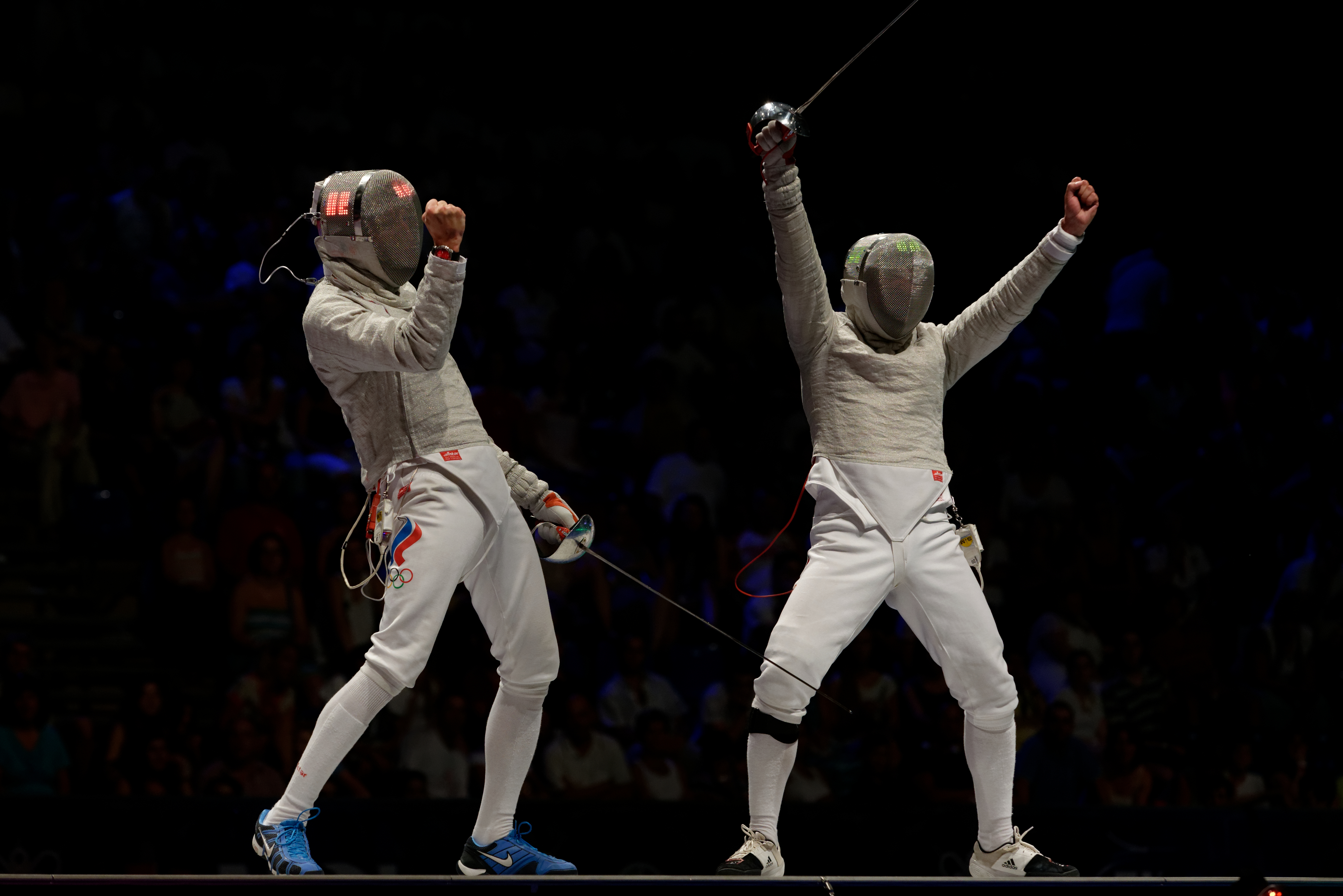
Veniamin Reshetnikov (L) and Nikolay Kovalev (R) both claim the hit; the referee must decide who scores the point. Final of the 2013 World Fencing Championships.

When both signals indicate, it rests upon the referee to decide which fencer scores the point. The decision is based on the concept of right of way which gives the point to the fencer who had priority, i.e. the attacking fencer. As with foil, the other right of way weapon, priority is gained in many ways, which can be broken down into active, passive, and defensive categories:

- Active:
  - Attacking the opponent. (In fencing the word "attack" is defined as: the initial offensive action made by extending the arm and continuously threatening the opponent's target, preceding the launching of the lunge or step. The flèche is illegal in sabre as a "crossover". In sabre the threat may be established with the point or the cutting edge, and the end of the attack coincides with the moment the front foot touches the strip.) Hitting with the blade after the front foot has landed constitutes a remise of the attack, and so an opponent's attack delivered at the same time would take the right of way in this case.
  - Executing an attack which is preceded by a beat on the opponent's weapon.
- Passive:
  - Establishing a point in line prior to the opponent initiating an attack. The hit must be completed with the point and have the point stick to their opponent's chest (not a poke that hits and then slides off). Derobement of the opponent's attempts to beat are allowed, but the point must continue to threaten the target, and a derobement when there is no attempt to beat also loses the right of way.
  - If an attack is executed against an opponent who has point in line, the attacker must remove the point in line (i.e., with a beat, etc.). Simply making contact with the blade is insufficient and the blade must actually be moved aside.
  - If an attempt to beat the blade is made, and missed (because of a derobe), the opponent maintains the right of way.
  - Point in line can lose priorities regardless of whether the fencer is advancing, stationary, or retreating, but is lost if the arm is bent or the point is moved away from targeting the opponent.
- Defensive:
  - Executing an immediate return offence following the opponent's failed attack; the failed attack can be the result of a parry (i.e., parry-riposte), or because it has fallen short of the target (commonly termed a "get-away-go"), or in any other way missed.

If neither fencer has 'right of way' in a double touch situation (typically, if both initiate the attack simultaneously in so far as the director can determine), the action is called a "simultaneous attack" and no point is awarded unless an attack is initiated first and is not parried or missed.

Right of way rules were initially established to encourage fencers to use parries and other techniques in order to hit without being hit, as they would logically desire to do if they were using sharp swords. Subsequently, the rules of right of way have been altered simply to keep the strategy and technique of sabre interesting and (relatively) easy to understand.

=== Referee ===
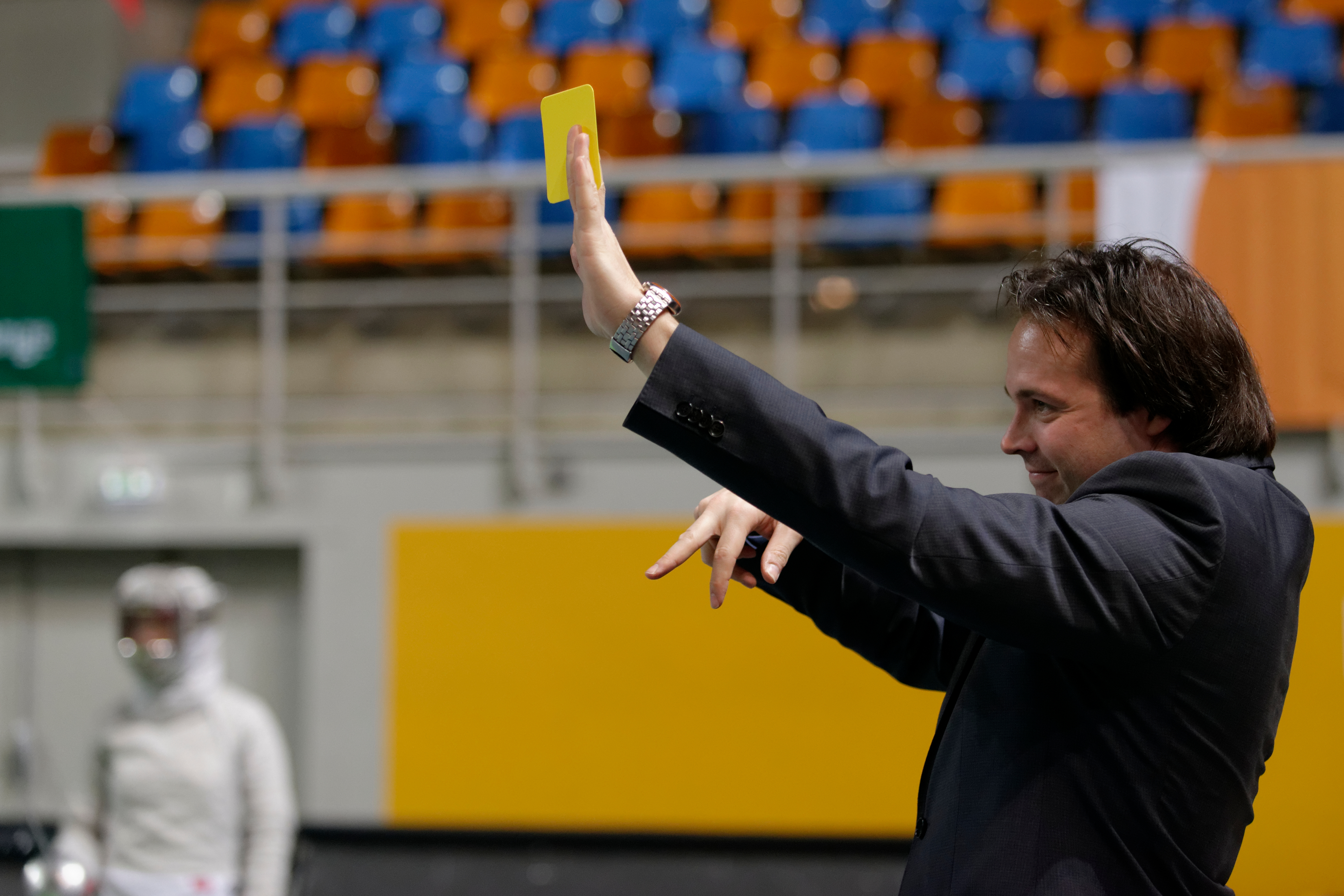
A referee shows a yellow card for a forbidden flèche in the 2014 Orléans Grand Prix

The referee may halt the action for reasons such as a safety hazard, fencer injury, or violation of the rules. When the referee says "halt", no further action may score a point. For cases of rules violations, the referee may choose to either warn the offender or show him or her a penalty card. A warning has no scoring implication. Cards, on the other hand, have further penalties:

- Yellow card: Offender's touch may be annulled, similar to a warning. This may be given if a fencer moves forward before "fence" is heard, or unnecessary action after "halt" is heard.
- Red card: Offender's touch usually annulled, point awarded to opponent. Two yellow cards result in a red card.
- Black card: Offender is removed from the tournament and the building. This can be caused by refusing to salute, or falsifying documents and covering up breaches in rules.

The referee will traditionally score the bout in French, but most non-French speaking referees tend to make calls in the relevant local language. However, in international competitions, the referees are required to use French. There are also associated hand motions the referees will make to indicate specific calls in order to bridge a potential language barrier. Most current referees are required to make calls both verbally and with the relevant hand motions to avoid any type of confusion.

== Technique ==
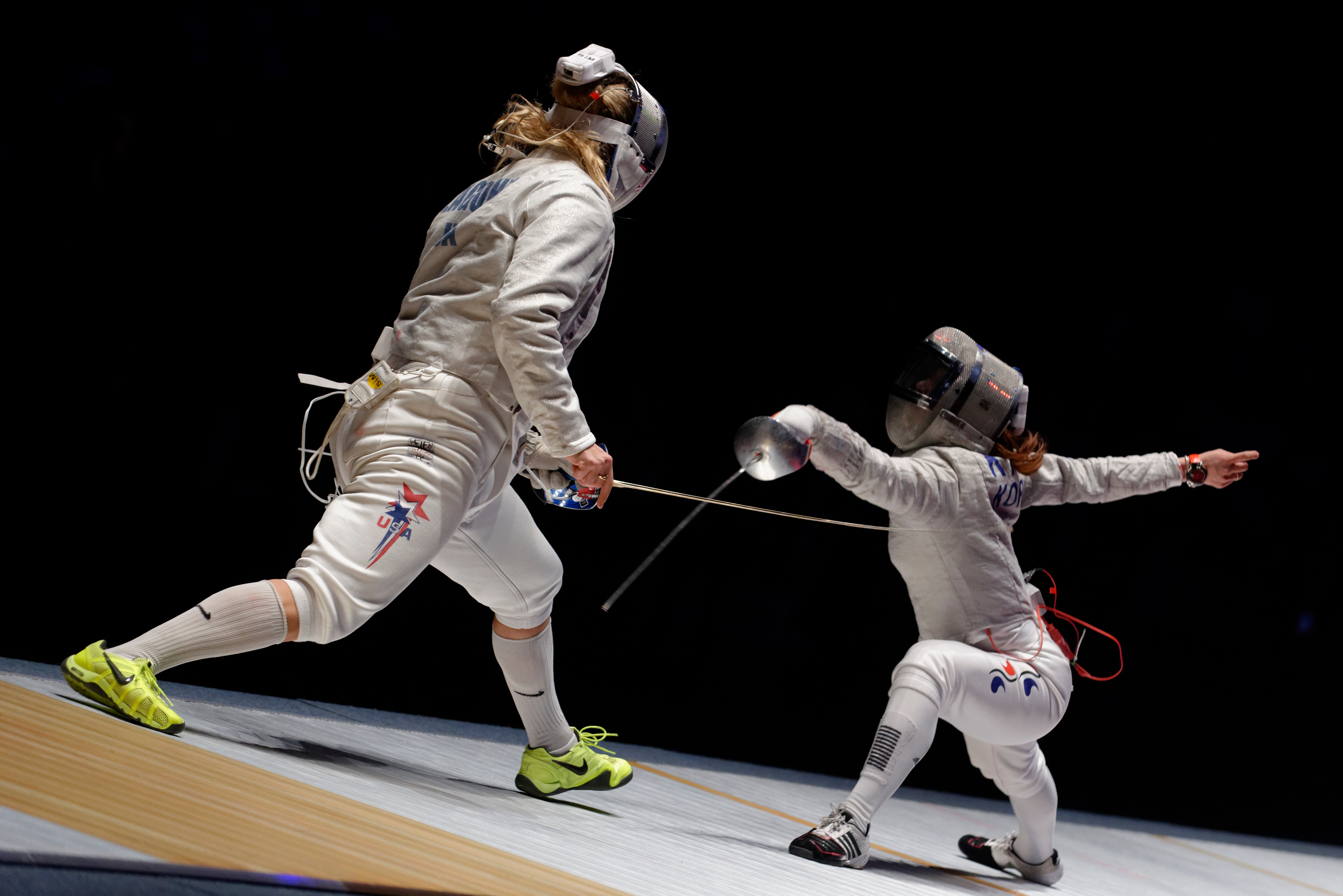
Kim Ji-yeon (R) attacks Mariel Zagunis (L) with a lunge in the 2014 Orléans World Cup

At sabre, it is generally easier to attack than to defend (for example, the timing favours remises) and high-level international sabre fencing is often very fast and very simple, although when required, top sabreurs do display an extended repertoire of tactical devices. In response to the relatively high speed of sabre fencing (sabre is the fastest sport in the world combat wise), the rules for sabre were changed to prohibit the forward cross-over (where the back foot passes the front foot) – it is now a cardable offence. Thus, the flèche attack is no longer permissible, so sabre fencers have instead begun to use a "flunge" (flying lunge). This attack begins like a flèche, but the fencer pushes off from the ground and moves quickly forward, attempting to land a hit before their feet cross over. Similarly, "running attacks" – consisting of a failed flèche followed by continuous remises – have also been eliminated.

Sabre defense comprises the three primary parries:

- Tierce, high outside, flank: The tierce parry is used to defend against attacks aimed at the upper outside line, specifically the fencer's flank and upper arm. The fencer raises their weapon hand to shoulder level, with the blade angled outward to deflect incoming attacks.
- Quarte, high inside, chest: The quarte parry is employed to block attacks directed at the upper inside line, particularly targeting the fencer's chest and upper arm on the inside. The fencer brings their weapon hand across their body, positioning the blade horizontally and inward to intercept the opponent's blade.
- Quinte, head: The quinte parry is designed to defend against attacks aimed at the fencer's head. The fencer lifts their weapon hand above their head, angling the blade slightly forward and downward to create a protective shield.

and three secondary parries:

- Prime, generally taken in a sweeping motion to cover the entire inside line - often used instead of quarte when moving from quinte
- Seconde, either guarding the low outside line - often used instead of tierce when moving from a "point-in-line"
- Sixte, Blade up and to the outside, wrist supinated. This parry can be lateral or circular. There is great debate over whether this guarde actually exists, or whether it is just a slightly extended tierce, just as in foil and épée parry nine is viewed by some to be just a high sixte.

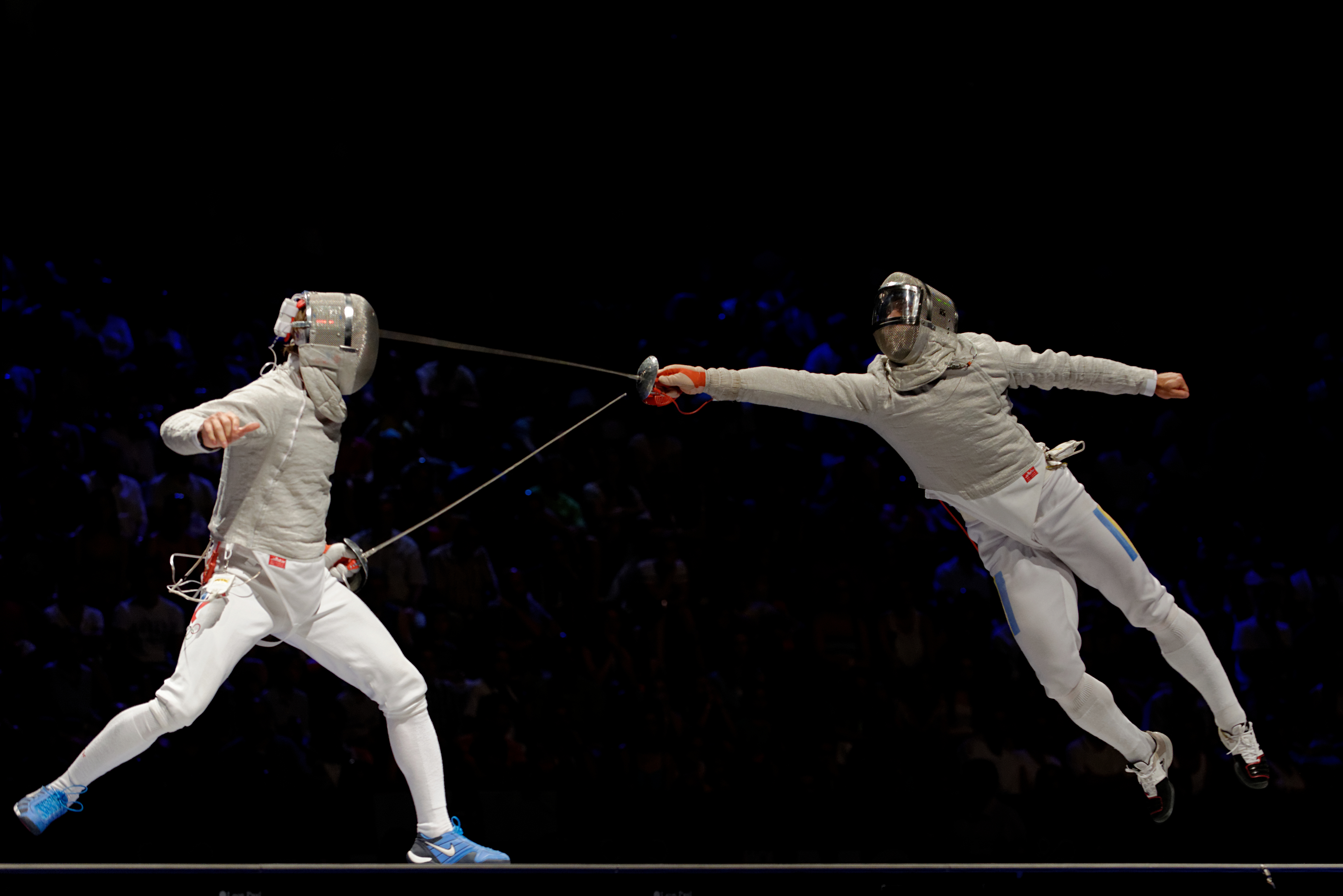
Tiberiu Dolniceanu (R) attacks Veniamin Reshetnikov (L) with a flunge during the 2013 World Championships

Another parry, lesser-known, but which works against opponents of the same handedness, is referred to as "the Hungarian". This parry is most useful when both fencers charge off the line towards each other. To perform the Hungarian, a fencer throws a "prime" parry when the opponent is within striking distance and sweeps upward into a "quinte" position, covering (in the process) nearly all target area, and performs the riposte as with a normal "quinte" parry. The Hungarian technique often works best if a step or angle is taken in the opposite direction of the "prime" parry. This technique will not work with two fencers of opposite handedness.

It follows from the nature of sabre parries (they block an incoming attack rather than deflecting it as in foil and épée) that they are static and must be taken as late as possible to avoid being duped by a feint attack, committing to a parry in the wrong line and being unable to change parry (which often involves completely altering the orientation of the blade while moving and rotating the wrist and forearm) to defend against the real attack quickly enough.

Circles, such as Circle 3, 4, and 5, defend against stabs to the body, which an ordinary parry would not block. This is extremely useful, as it is highly versatile, covering much of the target area.

There are variations of the primary and secondary parries where the fencer uses their body along with the blade. The most popular is when the fencer jumps into the air and throws a "Seconde." If done correctly, the defender can block an attack to the "Tierce" sector while taking advantage of the high ground. Another example is when the fencer squats to the floor and takes a "Quinte" to both make themselves a smaller target and block their only weak point.

Each fencing weapon has a different tempo, and the tempo for épée and foil is rather slow with sudden bursts of speed. Sabre is fast throughout the entire touch.
