= Fencing =

Type of armed combat sport

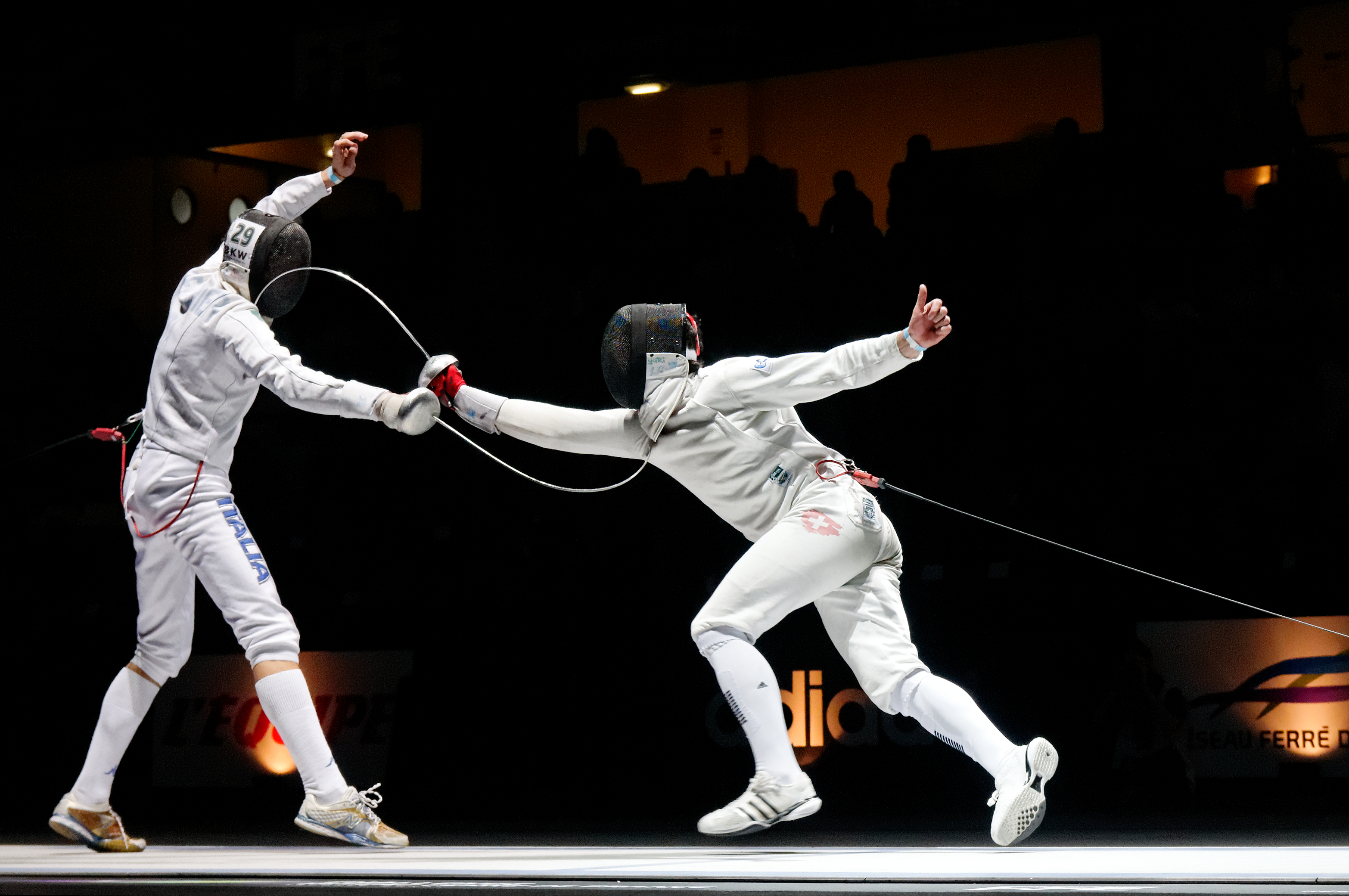
- Final of the Challenge Réseau Ferré de France–Trophée Monal 2012, épée world cup tournament in Paris
- Highest governing body: FIE
- First played: Between the 17th and 19th centuries Europe

Characteristics
- Contact: Semi-contact
- Team members: Singles or team relay
- Mixed-sex: Yes, separate
- Type: indoor
- Equipment: Épée, foil, sabre, body cord, lamé, grip
- Venue: Piste
- Glossary: Glossary of fencing

Presence
- Country or region: Worldwide
- Olympic: Part of Summer Olympic programme since 1896
- Paralympic: part of Summer Paralympic programme since 1960

Fencing
- Also known as: Épée fencing, foil fencing, sabre fencing
- Focus: Weaponry
- Hardness: Semi-contact
- Olympic sport: Present since inaugural 1896 Olympics
- Official website: fie.org

Fencing is a combat sport that features sword fighting. It consists of three primary disciplines: foil, épée, and sabre (also spelled saber), each with its own blade and set of rules. Most competitive fencers specialise in one of these disciplines. The modern sport gained prominence near the end of the 19th century, evolving from historical European swordsmanship. The Italian school altered the historical European martial art of classical fencing, and the French school later refined that system. Scoring points in a fencing competition is done by making contact with the opponent with one's sword.

The 1904 Olympic Games featured a fourth discipline of fencing known as singlestick, but it was dropped after that year and is not a part of modern fencing. Competitive fencing was one of the first sports to be featured in the Olympics and, along with athletics, cycling, swimming, and gymnastics, has been featured in every modern Olympics.

== Competitive fencing ==
=== Governing body ===
Fencing is governed by the Fédération Internationale d'Escrime (FIE), headquartered in Lausanne, Switzerland. The FIE is composed of 155 national federations, each of which is recognised by its state Olympic Committee as the sole representative of Olympic-style fencing in that country.

=== Rules ===
The FIE maintains the current rules used by major international events, including world cups, world championships and the Olympic Games. The FIE handles proposals to change the rules at an annual congress.

==== Bout scoring and duration ====
In fencing, each bout (i.e. a match between two individuals or teams) is decided by either reaching a set number of hits or outscoring the opponent within a specified time limit, depending on the format of the competition.

===== Individual matches =====
Pool bouts: In pool rounds, each bout is fenced to 5 hits or a single period of 3 minutes. If neither fencer has reached 5 hits when time expires, the bout ends and the higher-scoring fencer is declared the winner. If the score is tied, a tie is recorded. At the end of each bout, the number of hits scored by both fencers is also recorded.

Direct elimination bouts: In the knockout stage, each bout continues until one fencer scores 15 hits, or until the 9-minute total fencing time (split into three 3-minute periods) expires. A 1-minute break separates each period. The clock is paused whenever the action stops, such as after a valid hit. If the score is tied at the end of the third period, a 1-minute sudden-death overtime period is fenced. The first valid hit decides the winner; if no hit is scored, the fencer with priority (determined by a draw) wins.

===== Team matches =====
Each team usually fields three fencers (plus a substitute). A match consists of nine consecutive bouts, with every fencer on one team facing each fencer on the opposing team in a preset rotation. Scoring is cumulative, generally progressing in increments of up to five hits per bout, until one team reaches 45 hits or time expires. If tied at the end of the final bout, a 1-minute sudden-death period is fenced; the first valid hit wins, or if no hit is scored, the team with priority (decided by a draw) wins.

=== Universities and schools ===
University students compete internationally at the World University Games. The United States holds two national-level university tournaments (the NCAA championship and the USACFC National Championships). The BUCS holds fencing tournaments in the United Kingdom. Many universities in Ontario, Canada have fencing teams that participate in an annual inter-university competition called the OUA Finals.

National fencing organisations have set up programmes to encourage more students to fence. Examples include the Regional Youth Circuit program in the US and the Leon Paul Youth Development series in the UK.

The UK hosts two national competitions in which schools compete against each other directly: the Public Schools Fencing Championship, a competition only open to Independent Schools, and the Scottish Secondary Schools Championships, open to all secondary schools in Scotland. It contains both teams and individual events and is highly anticipated. Schools organise matches directly against one another and school age pupils can compete individually in the British Youth Championships.

In recent years, attempts have been made to introduce fencing to a wider and younger audience, by using foam and plastic swords, which require much less protective equipment. This makes it much less expensive to provide classes, and thus easier to take fencing to a wider range of schools than traditionally has been the case. There is even a competition series in Scotland – the Plastic-and-Foam Fencing FunLeague – specifically for Primary and early Secondary school-age children using this equipment.

== History ==
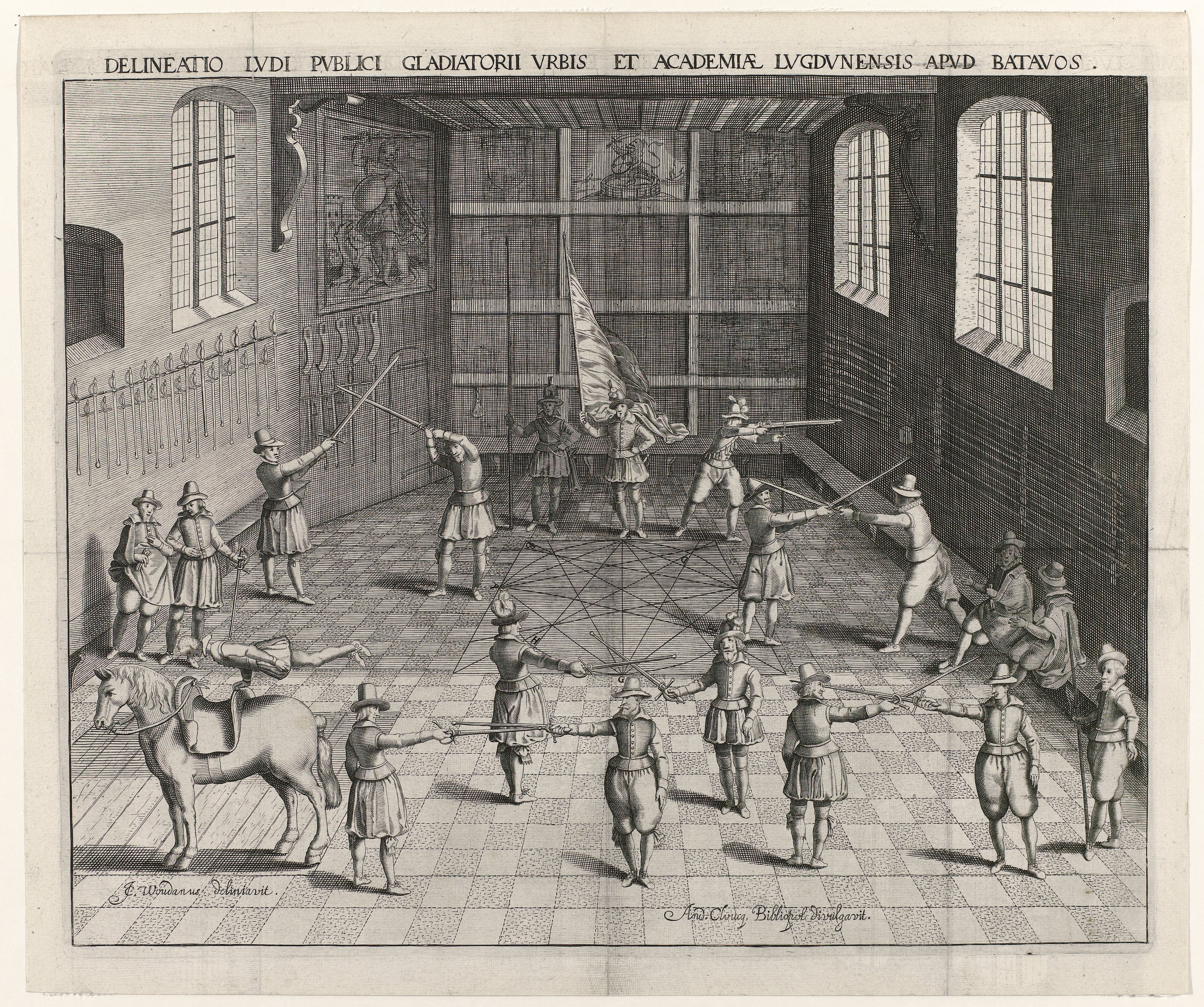
Fencing School at Leiden University, Netherlands, 1610

Fencing traces its roots to the development of swordsmanship for duels and self-defence. Described as "high-speed chess", each bout begins and ends with a salute. Good sportsmanship and honor are stressed at every level of training and competition.

The oldest surviving treatise on western fencing is the Royal Armouries Ms. I.33, also known as the Tower manuscript, written c. 1300 in present-day Germany, which discusses the usage of the arming sword together with the buckler. It was followed by a number of treatises, primarily from Germany and Italy, with the oldest surviving Italian treatise being Fior di Battaglia by Fiore dei Liberi, written c. 1400. However, because they were written for the context of a knightly duel with a primary focus on archaic weapons such as the arming sword, longsword, or poleaxe, these older treatises do not really stand in continuity with modern fencing.

From the 16th century onward, the Italian school of fencing would be dominated by the Bolognese or Dardi-School of fencing, named after its founder, Filippo Dardi, a Bolognese fencing master and Professor of Geometry at the University of Bologna. Unlike the previous traditions, the Bolognese school would primarily focus on the sidesword being either used alone or in combination with a buckler, a cape, a parrying dagger, or dual-wielded with another sidesword, though some Bolognese masters, such as Achille Marozzo, would still cover the usage of the two-handed greatsword or spadone. The Bolognese school would eventually spread outside of Italy and lay the foundation for modern fencing, eclipsing both older Italian and German traditions. This was partially due to the German schools' focus on archaic weapons such as the longsword, but also due to a general decline in fencing within Germany.

The mechanics of modern fencing originated in the 18th century in an Italian school of fencing of the Renaissance, and under their influence, were improved by the French school of fencing. The Spanish school of fencing stagnated and was replaced by the Italian and French schools.

=== Development into a sport ===
The shift towards fencing as a sport rather than as military training happened from the mid-18th century, and was led by Domenico Angelo, who established a fencing academy, Angelo's School of Arms, in Carlisle House, Soho, London in 1763. There, he taught the aristocracy the fashionable art of swordsmanship. His school was run by three generations of his family and dominated the art of European fencing for almost a century.

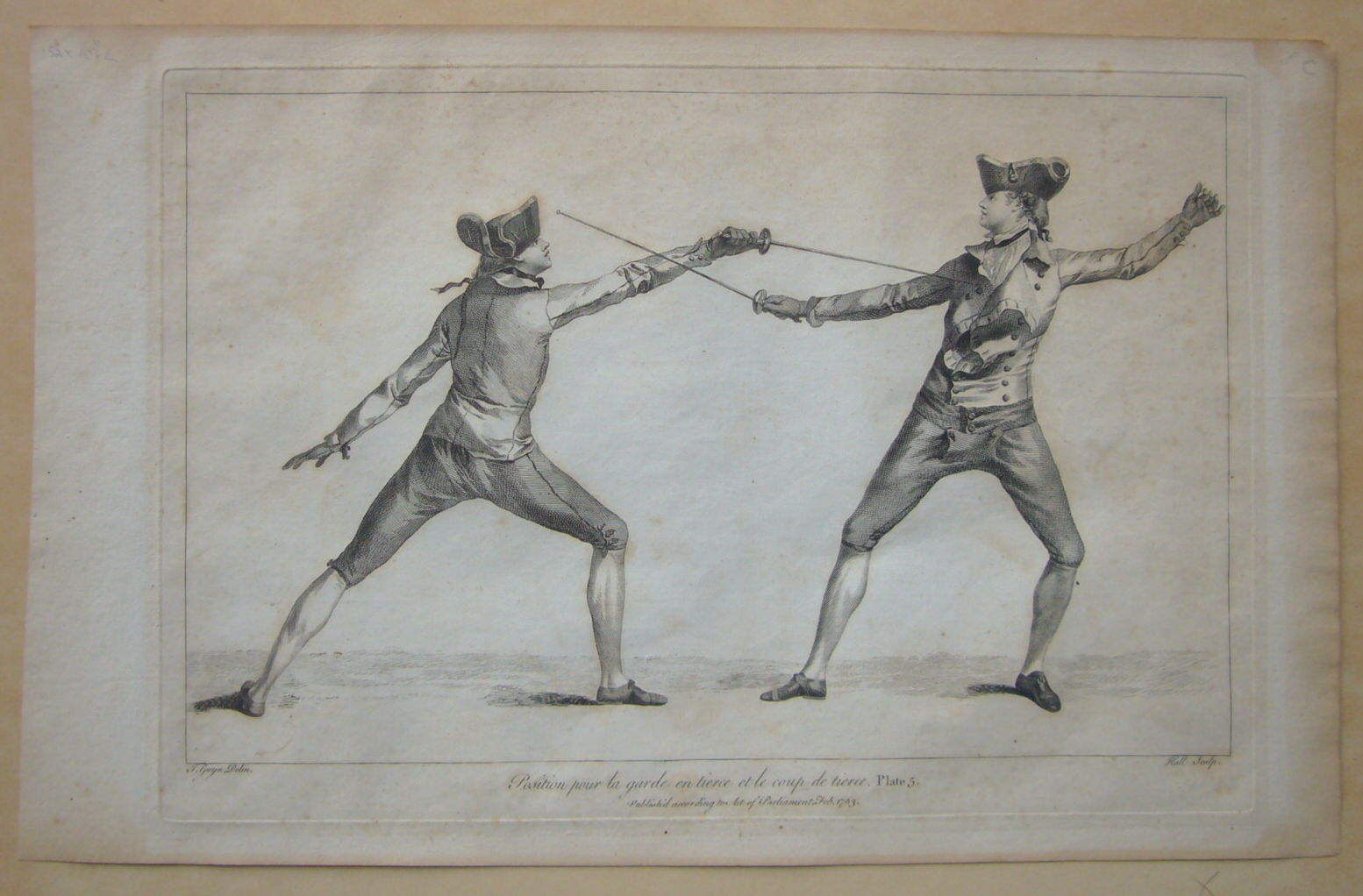
1763 fencing print from Domenico Angelo's instruction book. Angelo was instrumental in turning fencing into an athletic sport.

He established the essential rules of posture and footwork that still govern modern sport fencing, although his attacking and parrying methods were still much different from current practice. Although he intended to prepare his students for real combat, he was the first fencing master to emphasise the health and sporting benefits of fencing more than its use as a killing art, particularly in his influential book L'École des armes (The School of Fencing), published in 1763.

Basic conventions were collated and set down during the 1880s by the French fencing master Camille Prévost. It was during this time that many officially recognised fencing associations began to appear in different parts of the world, such as the Amateur Fencers League of America was founded in 1891, the Amateur Fencing Association of Great Britain in 1902, and the Fédération Nationale des Sociétés d’Escrime et Salles d’Armes de France in 1906.

The first regularised fencing competition was held at the inaugural Grand Military Tournament and Assault at Arms in 1880, held at the Royal Agricultural Hall, in Islington in June. The Tournament featured a series of competitions between army officers and soldiers. Each bout was fought for five hits and the foils were pointed with black to aid the judges. The Amateur Gymnastic & Fencing Association drew up an official set of fencing regulations in 1896.

Fencing was part of the Olympic Games in the summer of 1896. Sabre events have been held at every Summer Olympics; foil events have been held at every Summer Olympics except 1908; épée events have been held at every Summer Olympics except in the summer of 1896 because of unknown reasons.

Starting with épée in 1933, side judges were replaced by the Laurent-Pagan electrical scoring apparatus, with an audible tone and a red or green light indicating when a touch landed. Foil was automated in 1956, sabre in 1988. The scoring box reduced the bias in judging, and permitted more accurate scoring of faster actions, lighter touches, and more touches to the back and flank than before.

=== Women's fencing ===
Women's fencing developed in parallel with men's fencing, albeit much less expansively. Having roots — much like men's fencing — in the Royal Armouries Ms. I.33 where a female fencer named Walpurgis is depicted, women's fencing discreetly continued throughout the 16th and 17th centuries, and was sometimes as the subject of mythologisation. The aforementioned Domenico Angelo also accepted female students, among whom were actresses from London theatres, and the Duchess of Queensbury. Following Angelo's example, other fencing schools soon opened to women, leading to the rise of many talented fencers, such as Jaguarina.

Competitive women's fencing developed over the course of the 20th and 21st centuries, with women's individual foil first introduced to the Olympics in the 1924 Paris Games. Women's team foil was introduced to the Olympics in the 1960 Rome Games, but had been practiced extensively beforehand in the fencing world championships since 1932. Women continued for a time to be restricted from the so-called "advanced weapons" (épée and sabre) as they were considered too dangerous, but these too were soon included in the Olympics in 1996 and 2004 respectively. The introduction of women's sabre in 2004 forced the introduction of a rotation of team events, due to the International Olympic Comittee's maximum quota of 10 events for fencing. The IOC eventually changed their ruling on this, and the 2020 Olympics were the first to include all fencing events.

== Weapons ==
Each of the three weapons in fencing has its own rules and strategies.

=== Foil ===
Valid foil targets

The foil is a light thrusting weapon with a maximum weight of 500 grams. The foil targets the torso, but not the arms or legs. The foil has a small circular hand guard that serves to protect the hand from direct stabs. As the hand is not a valid target in foil, this is primarily for safety. Touches are scored only with the tip; hits with the side of the blade do not register on the electronic scoring apparatus (and do not halt the action). Touches that land outside the target area (called an off-target touch and signalled by a distinct color on the scoring apparatus) stop the action, but are not scored. Only a single touch can be awarded to either fencer at the end of a phrase. If both fencers land touches within 300 ms (± 25 ms tolerance) to register two lights on the machine, the referee uses the rules of "right of way" to determine which fencer is awarded the touch, or if an off-target hit has priority over a valid hit, in which case no touch is awarded. If the referee is unable to determine which fencer has right of way, no touch is awarded.

=== Épée ===
Valid épée targets

The épée is a thrusting weapon like the foil, but heavier, with a maximum total weight of 775 grams. In épée, the entire body is a valid target. The épée features a large, bell-shaped hand guard that extends to protect the entire hand and wrist. Like foil, hits must be with the tip and not the sides of the blade. Hits with the side of the blade do not register on the electronic scoring apparatus (and do not halt the action). As the entire body is a valid target, there is no concept of an off-target touch. Unlike foil and sabre, épée does not use "right of way", hence simultaneous hits score for both fencers. However, if the score is tied in a match at the last point and a double touch is scored, the point is null and void.

=== Sabre ===
Valid sabre targets

The sabre is a cutting and thrusting weapon that targets the body above the waist. Specifically, the target comprises any part of the body above a horizontal line drawn between the top of the hip bones and then horizontally round the fencer's trunk. Sabre is the newest weapon to be used. Like the foil, the maximum legal weight of a sabre is 500 grams. The hand guard on the sabre extends from hilt to the point at which the blade connects to the pommel. This guard is generally turned outwards during sport to protect the sword arm from touches. Hits with the entire blade or point are valid. As in foil, touches that land outside the target area are not scored. However, unlike foil, these off-target touches do not stop the action, and the fencing continues. In the case of both fencers landing a scoring touch, the referee determines which fencer receives the point for the action, according to the rules of the "right of way".

== Equipment ==
=== Protective clothing ===
Most personal protective equipment for fencing is made of tough cotton or nylon. Kevlar was added to top level uniform pieces (jacket, breeches, underarm protector, lamé, and the bib of the mask) following the death of Vladimir Smirnov at the 1982 World Championships in Rome. However, Kevlar is degraded by both ultraviolet light and chlorine, which can complicate cleaning.

Other ballistic fabrics, such as Dyneema, have been developed that resist puncture, and which do not degrade the way that Kevlar does. FIE rules state that tournament wear must be made of fabric that resists a force of 800 newtons (180 lb_{f}), and that the mask bib must resist twice that amount.

In general, FIE requires that "equipment and clothing must provide the competitor with the maximum protection compatible with the freedom of movement necessary for fencing", and may be of any colour, excepting black.

The complete fencing kit includes:

Jacket
The jacket is form-fitting, and has a strap (croissard) that passes between the legs. A small gorget of folded fabric is sewn in around the collar to prevent an opponent's blade from slipping under the mask and along the jacket upwards towards the neck. It must be made entirely from a cloth able to resist a pressure of 800N. The jacket includes a lining so that there is a double thickness of material for the sleeve down to the elbow of the sword arm and on the torso. Fencing instructors often wear more resistant kit, as additional protection from the frequent hits an instructor endures.
Plastron
The plaustron or plastron is an underarm protector worn underneath the jacket featuring only one sleeve. It must be made entirely from a cloth able to resist a pressure of 800N. The plaustron covers what are considered the "vital upper areas of the body," which are the "neck under the bib, the two hollows above and below the collar bone, the region surrounding the armpit of the sword arm, and that covering the heart" It provides double protection on the side of the sword arm and upper arm. There is no seam under the arm, which would line up with the jacket seam and provide a weak spot.
Glove
The sword hand is protected by a glove with a gauntlet that prevents blades from going up the sleeve and causing injury. The glove also improves grip. The gauntlet (cuff) of the glove must cover around half of the forearm in order to prevent the opponent's sword from entering the sleeve of the jacket. The glove may be slightly padded. The palm and back of the glove must be of a cloth able to resist a pressure of 800N, the cuff one of 350N, and the seams one of 200N. In sabre, all of the gauntlet of the glove must be of a conductive material up until the wrist (or more specifically the external cubital styloid, a small prominent bone of the wrist).
Breeches
Breeches or knickers are short trousers that end just below the knee. The breeches are required to have 10 cm of overlap with the jacket. They must be made entirely in cloth able to resist a pressure of 800N. Breeches must be worn with socks which cover the legs right up to the breeches, and must be made in such a way that they cannot fall down. To this end, most are equipped with suspenders (braces).
Socks
Fencing socks are long enough to cover the knee and feature padded reinforcement at the shin level to protect the part from hits.
Shoes
Fencing shoes have flat soles, and are reinforced on the inside of the back foot, and in the heel for the front foot. The reinforcement prevents wear from lunging and protect the foot from hits (used in épée fencing).
Mask
The fencing mask has a bib that protects the neck. The mask should support 12 kilograms (26 lb) on the metal mesh and 350 newtons (79 lb_{f}) of penetration resistance on the bib. FIE regulations dictate that masks must withstand 25 kilograms (55 lb) on the mesh and 1,600 newtons (360 lb_{f}) on the bib. The mesh must be a maximum of 2.1mm, with a gauge of at least 1mm. In foil, the mesh of the mask must not extend below the chin, and any part of the bib below 1.5-2cm of the chin must be of a conductive material. In épée the mask must not be covered in any conductive material or material that may cause the point of the épée to glance off. In sabre the mask mesh and bib must both be conductive. Some modern masks have a see-through visor in the front of the mask. These have been used at high level competitions (World Championships etc.), however, they are currently banned in foil and épée by the FIE, following a 2009 incident in which a visor was pierced during the European Junior Championship competition. There are foil, sabre, and three-weapon masks.
Chest protector
The chest protector or chest guard protects the upper chest and is made of a rigid material, usually plastic. It is compulsory for female fencers and sometimes worn by males. Fencing instructors also wear them, as they are hit far more often during training than their students. In foil fencing, the hard surface of a chest protector decreases the likelihood that a hit registers, and so it must be worn under the plaustron in order to avoid it causing points to not register.
Lamé
A lamé, conductive jacket, or over-jacket is a layer of electrically conductive material worn over the fencing jacket in foil and sabre fencing. The lamé covers the entire target area, and makes the registration of the hits by the scoring box possible. In épée fencing the lamé is unnecessary, since the target area spans the competitor's entire body. In sabre fencing, the lamé covers the torso and arms, and must be secured at the wrist with an elastic band; in foil fencing, it overs only the torso, and must be made such that when laid flat there is a straight line between the groin and the top of the hip bones. A body cord is necessary to register scoring. It attaches to the weapon and runs inside the jacket sleeve, then down the back and goes out to plug into the scoring box. In sabre and foil fencing, the body cord connects to the lamé as well in order to create a circuit to the scoring box.

Elements of protective clothing

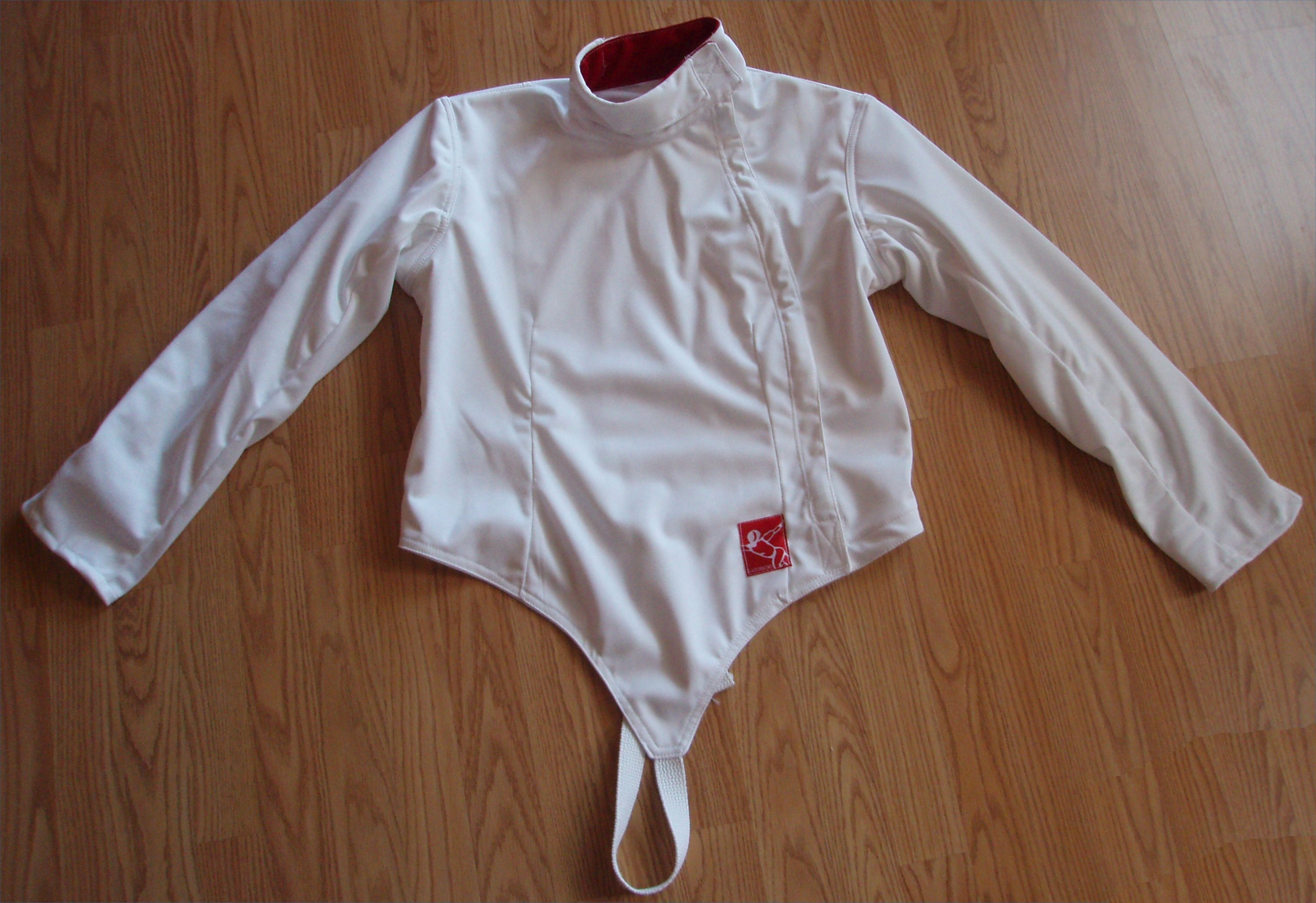
Jacket

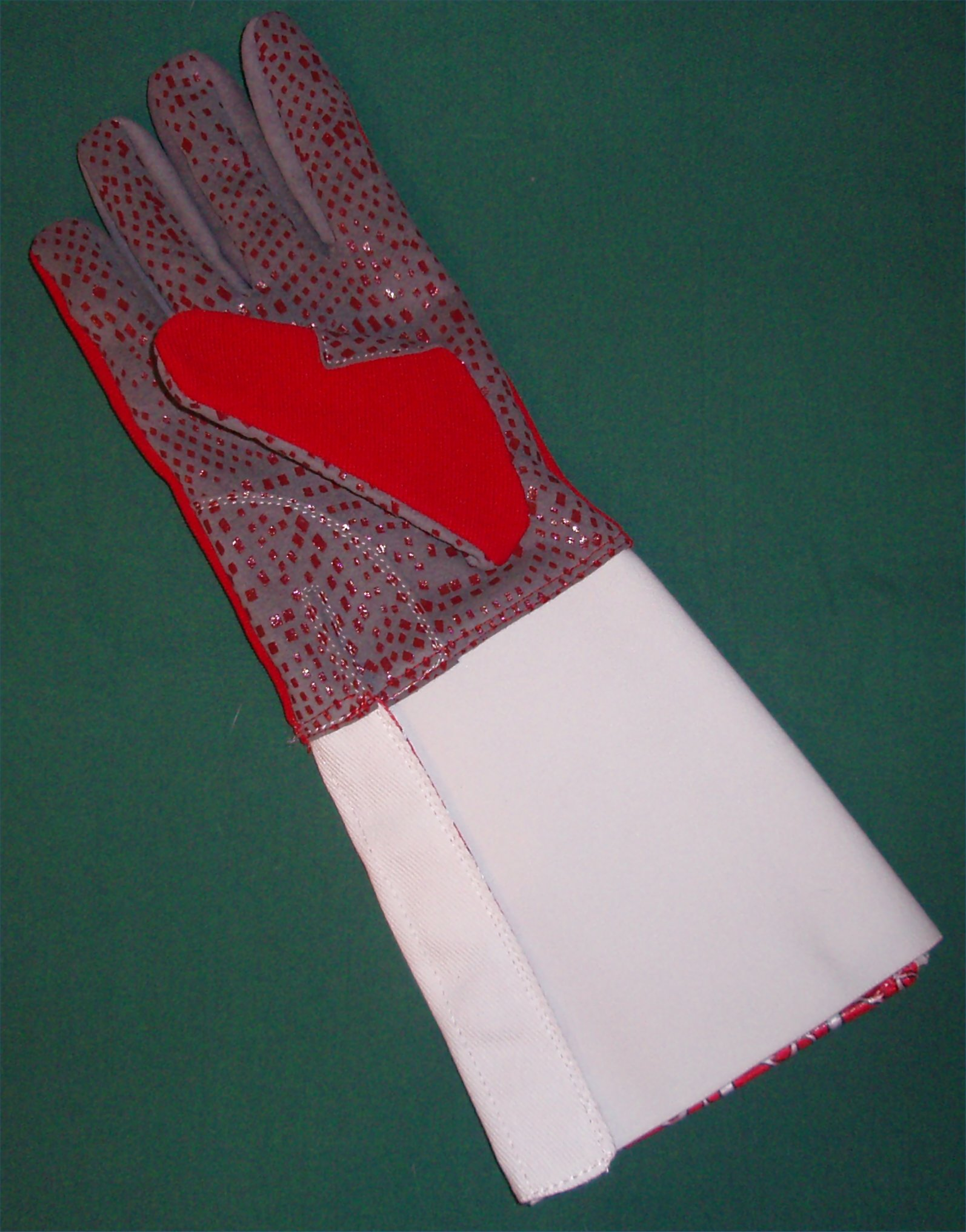
Glove

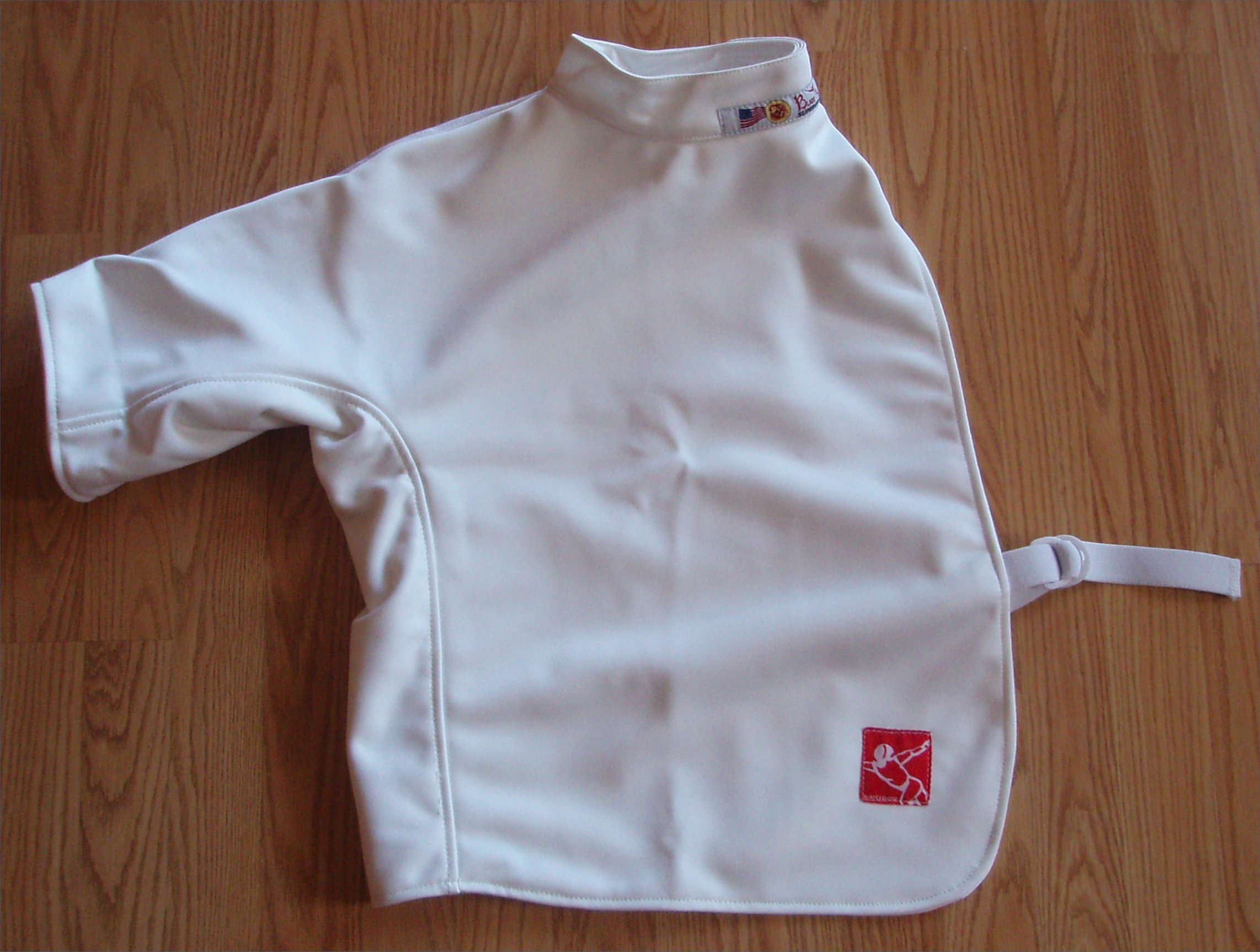
Sous-Plastron

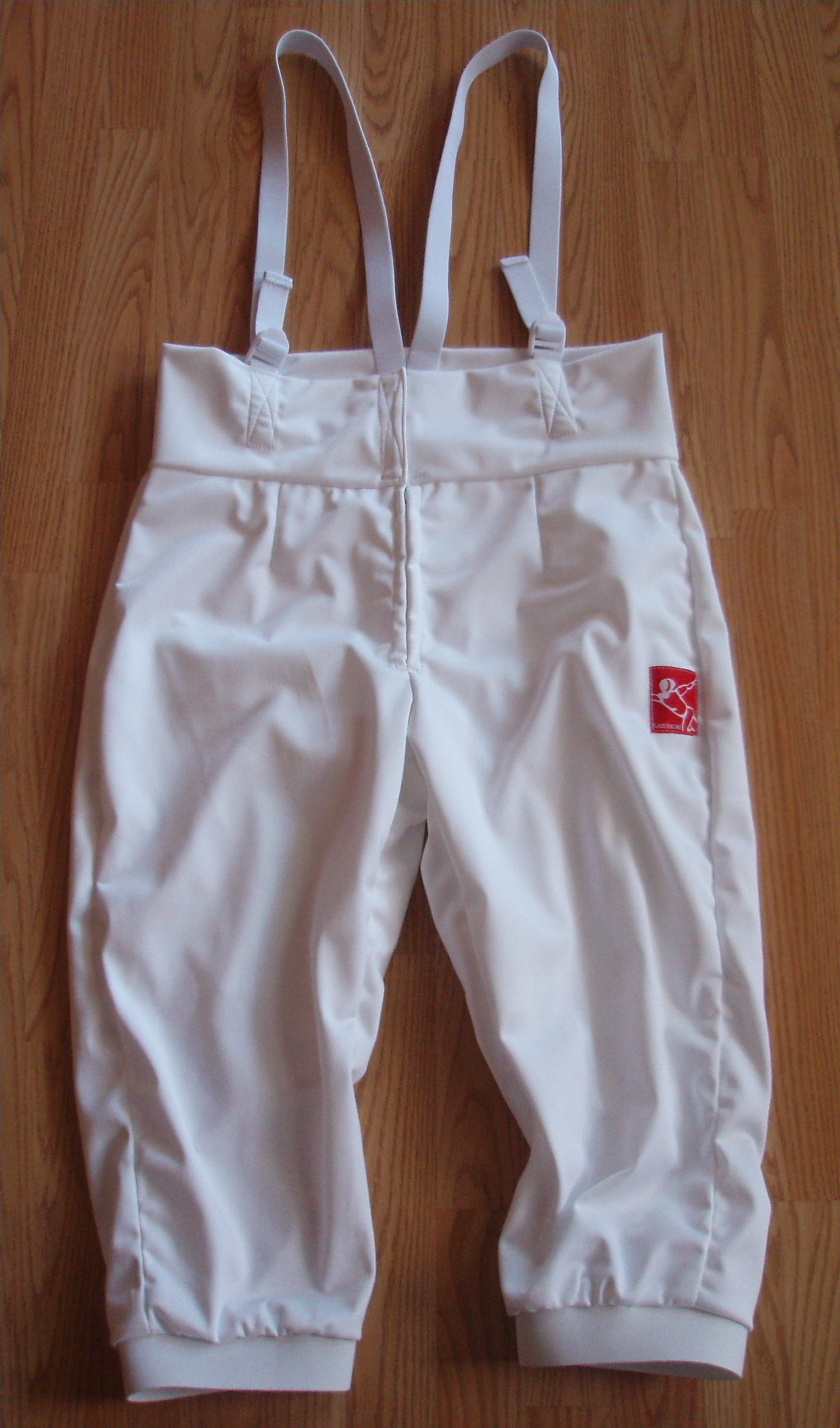
Breeches/Knickers

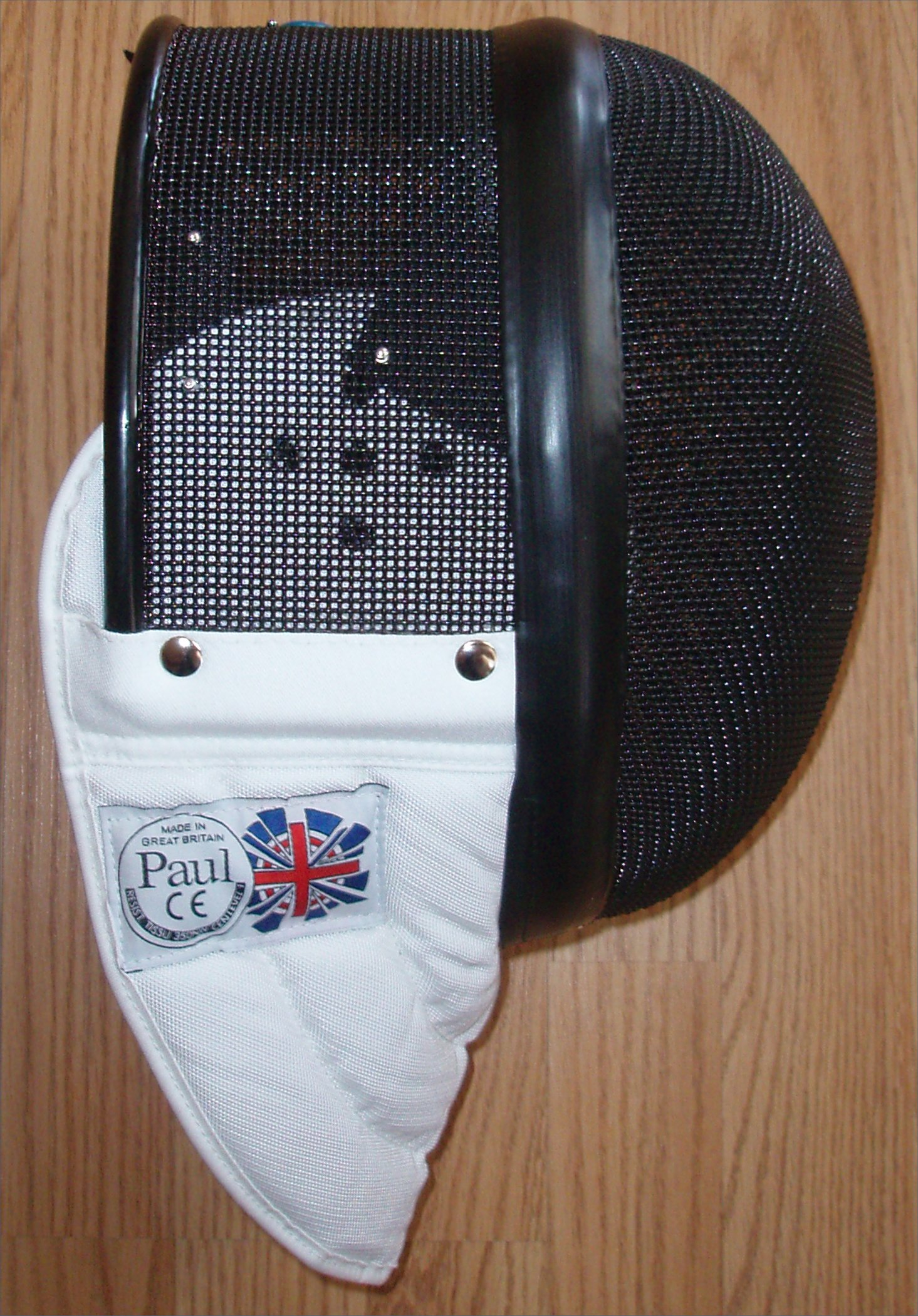
Mask

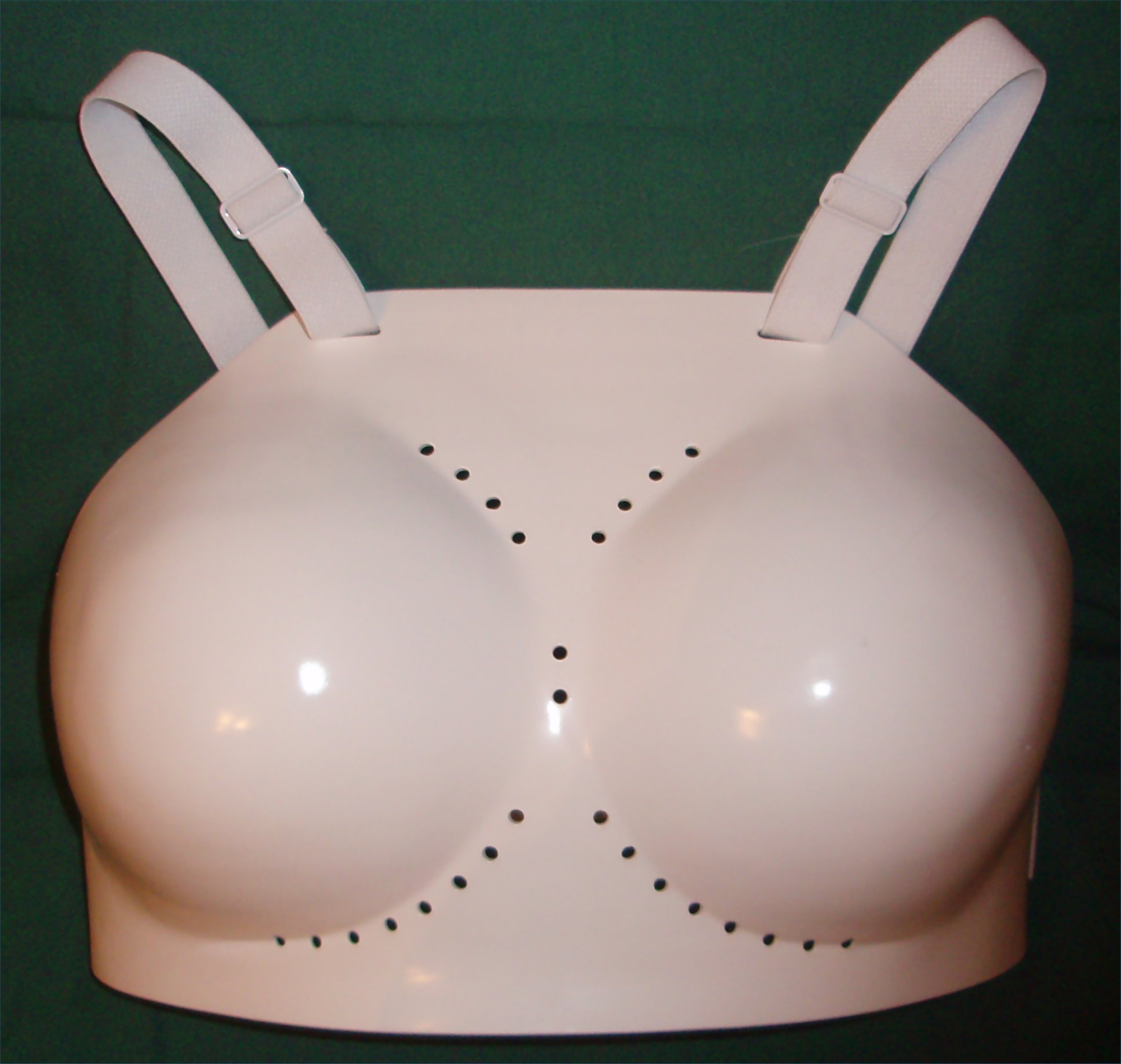
Chest protector for women

Traditionally, the fencer's uniform is white, while an instructor's uniform is black. This may be due to the occasional pre-electric practice of covering the point of the weapon in dye, soot, or coloured chalk in order to make it easier for the referee to determine the placing of the touches. As this is no longer a factor in the electric era, the FIE rules have been relaxed to allow coloured uniforms (save black). The guidelines also limit the permitted size and positioning of sponsorship logos.

=== Grips ===
Some pistol grips used by foil and épée fencers

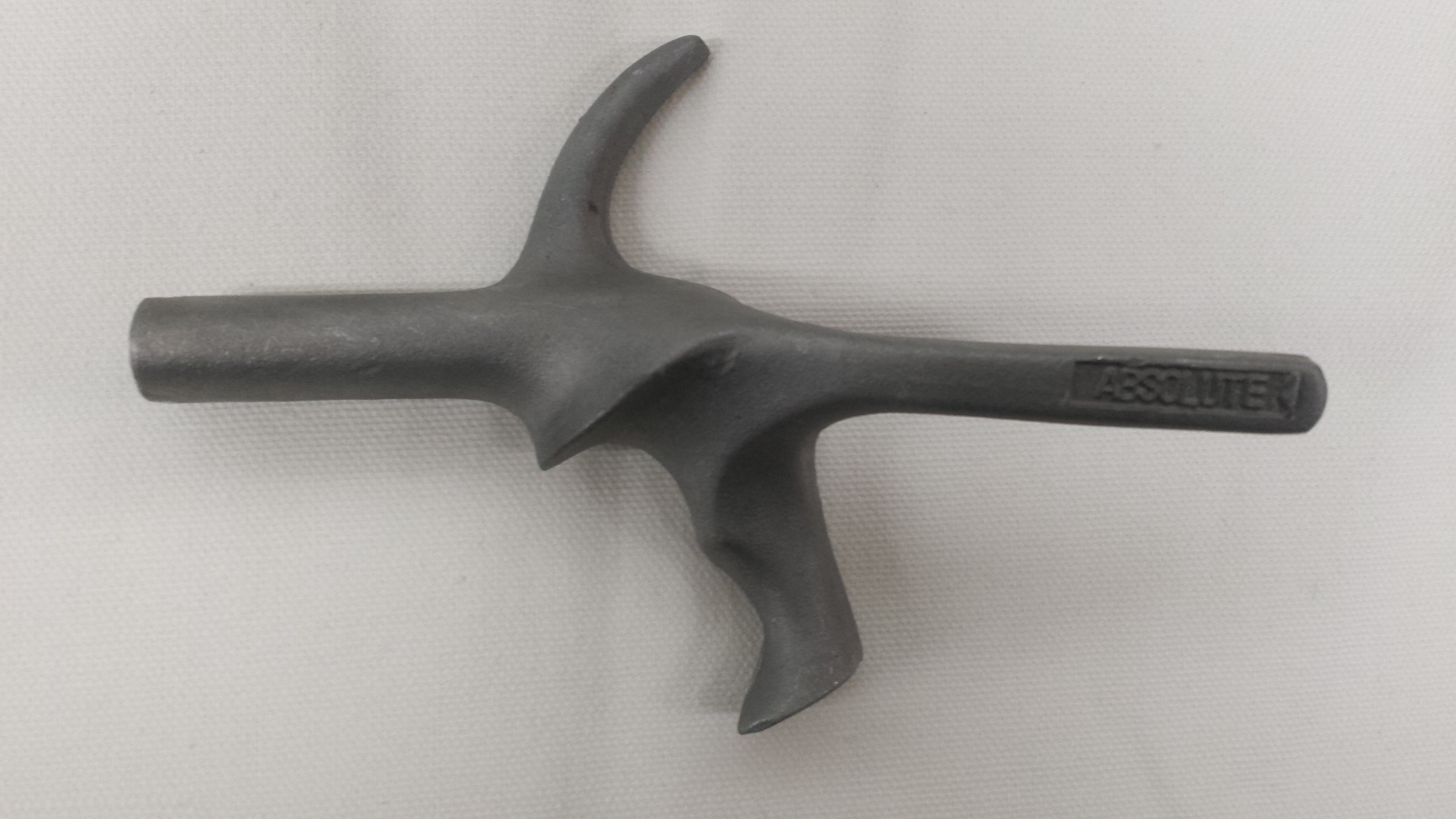
Visconti grip

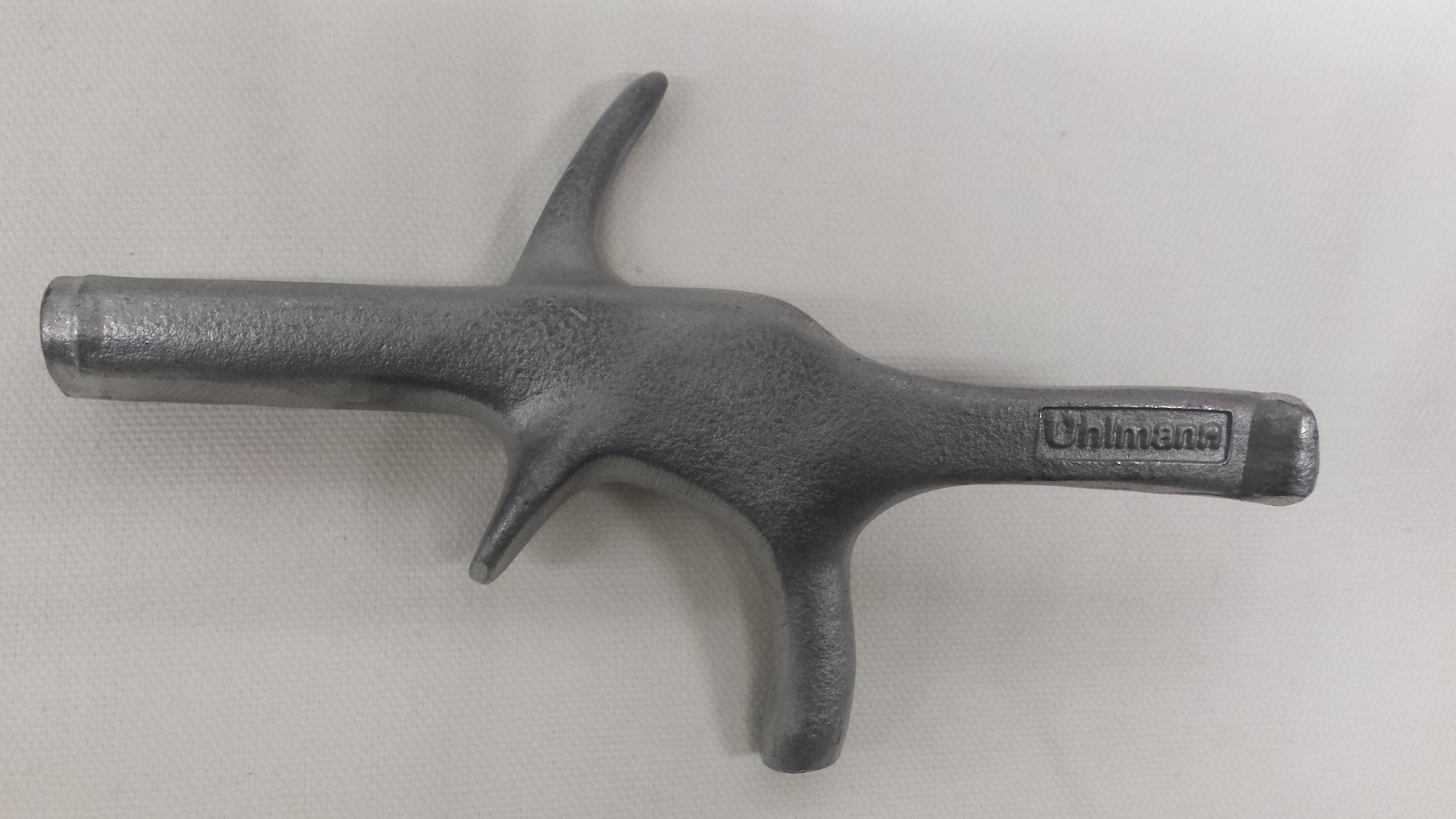
Belgian grip

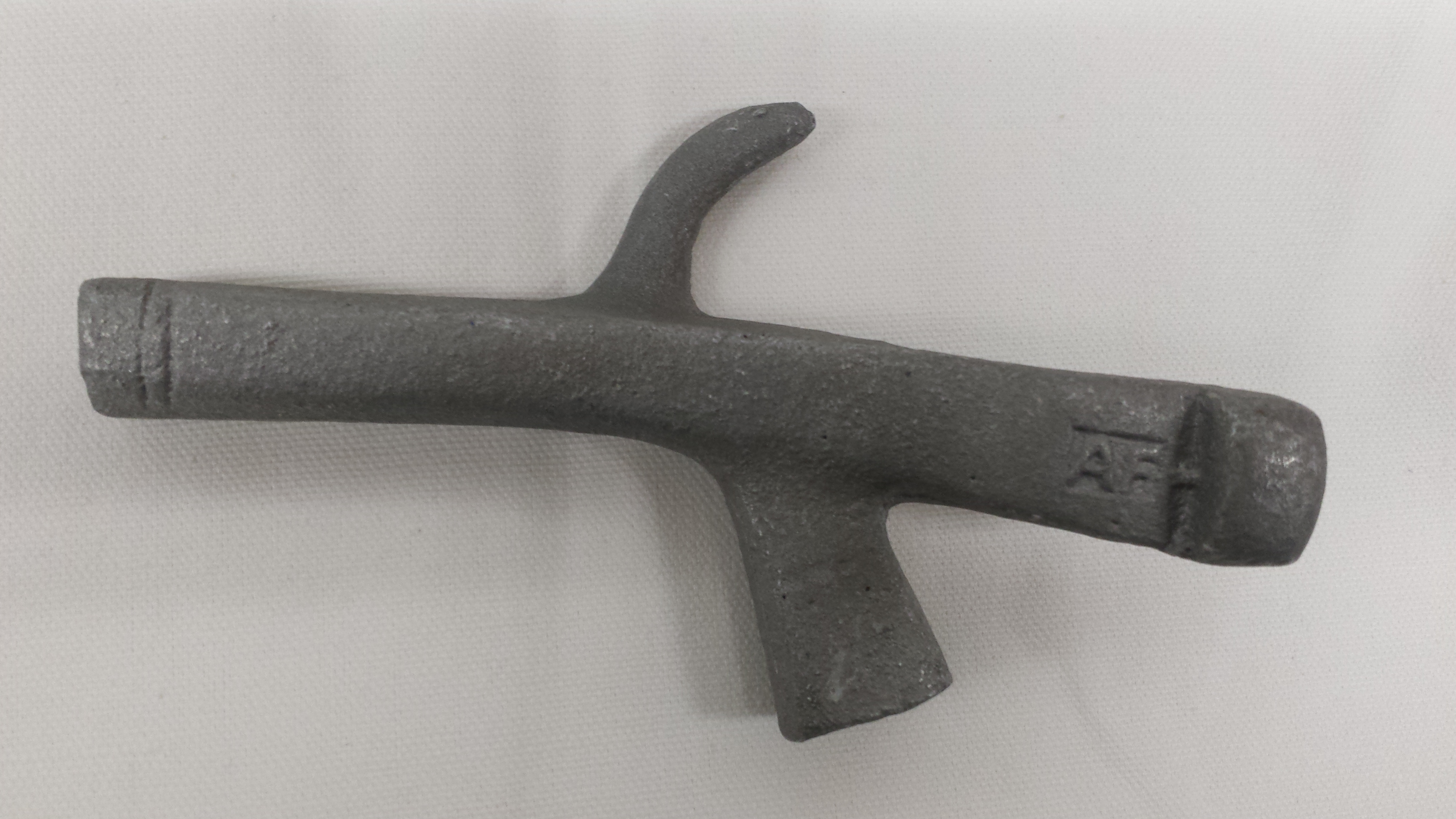
Russian grip

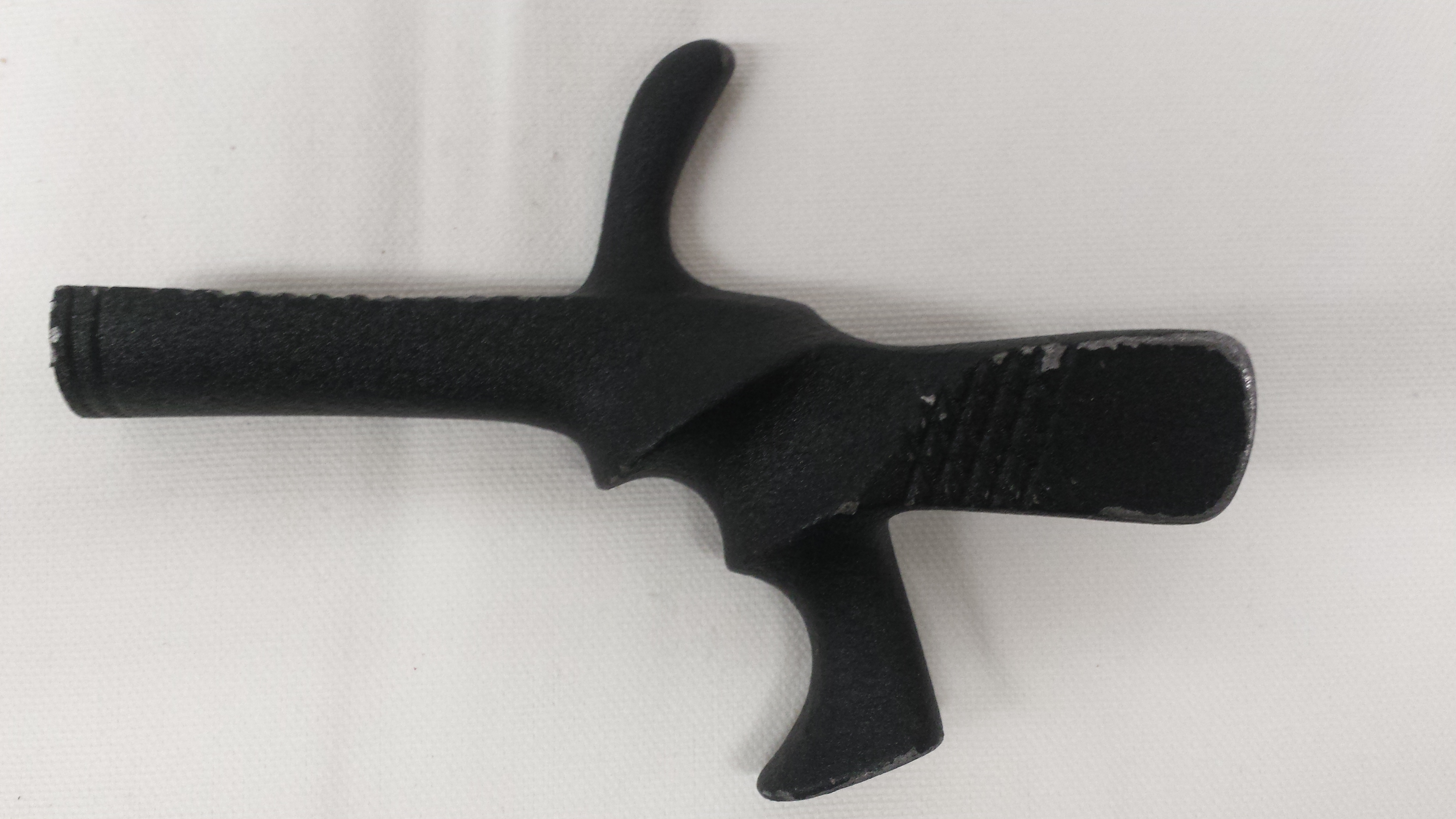
Hungarian grip

=== Electric equipment ===
A set of electric fencing equipment is required to participate in electric fencing. Electric equipment in fencing varies depending on the weapon with which it is used in accordance. The main component of a set of electric equipment is the body cord. The body cord serves as the connection between a fencer and a reel of wire that is part of a system for electrically detecting that the weapon has touched the opponent. There are two types: one for épée, and one for foil and sabre.

Épée body cords consist of two sets of three prongs each connected by a wire. One set plugs into the fencer's weapon, with the other connecting to the reel. Foil and sabre body cords have only two prongs (or a twist-lock bayonet connector) on the weapon side, with the third wire connecting instead to the fencer's lamé. The need in foil and sabre to distinguish between on and off-target touches requires a wired connection to the valid target area.

A body cord consists of three wires known as the A, B, and C lines. At the reel connector (and both connectors for Épée cords) The B pin is in the middle, the A pin is 1.5 cm to one side of B, and the C pin is 2 cm to the other side of B. This asymmetrical arrangement ensures that the cord cannot be plugged in the wrong way around.

In foil, the A line is connected to the lamé and the B line runs up a wire to the tip of the weapon. The B line is normally connected to the C line through the tip. When the tip is depressed, the circuit is broken and one of three things can happen:

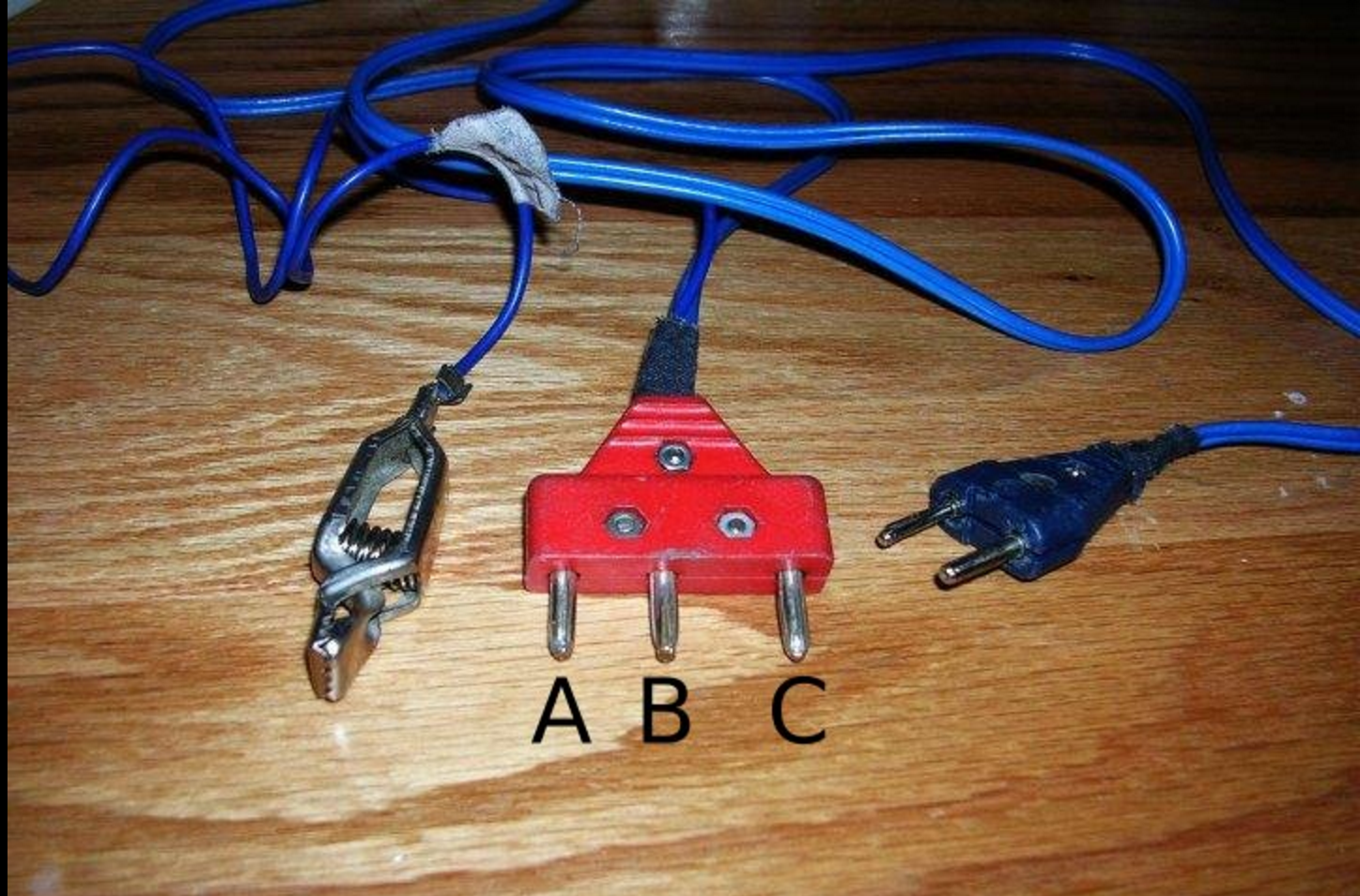
A foil/sabre body cord. Left to right: alligator clip, connection to reel, connection to weapon.

- The tip is touching the opponent's lamé (their A line): Valid touch
- The tip is touching the opponent's weapon or the grounded strip: nothing, as the current is still flowing to the C line.
- The tip is not touching either of the above: Off-target hit (white light).

In Épée, the A and B lines run up separate wires to the tip (there is no lamé). When the tip is depressed, it connects the A and B lines, resulting in a valid touch. However, if the tip is touching the opponents weapon (their C line) or the grounded strip, nothing happens when it is depressed, as the current is redirected to the C line. Grounded strips are particularly important in Épée, as without one, a touch to the floor registers as a valid touch (rather than off-target as in Foil).

In Sabre, similarly to Foil, the A line is connected to the lamé, but both the B and C lines are connected to the body of the weapon. Any contact between one's B/C line (either one, as they are always connected) and the opponent's A line (their lamé) results in a valid touch. There is no need for grounded strips in Sabre, as hitting something other than the opponent's lame does not register.

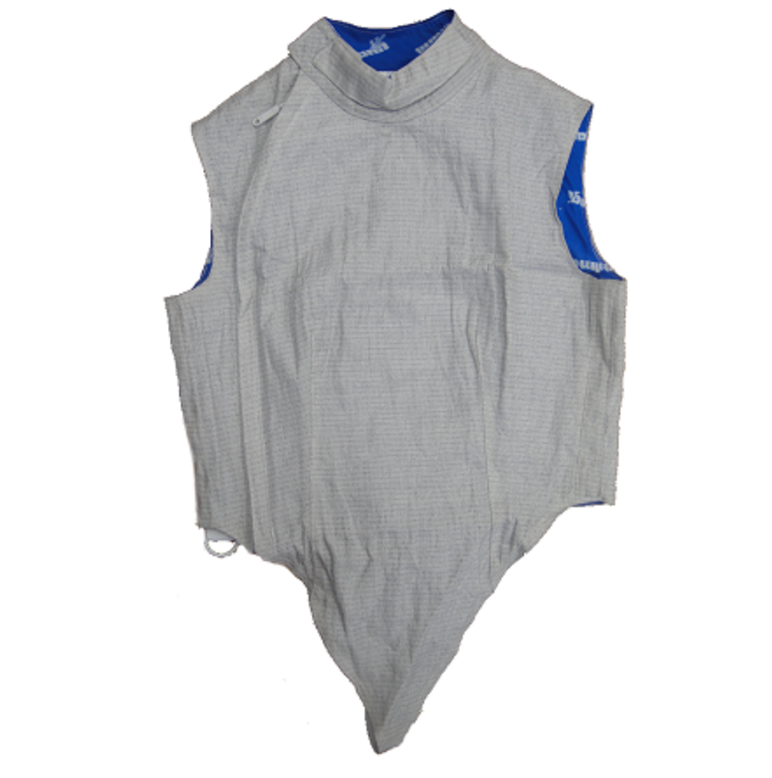
A foil lamé conductive vest

In a professional fencing competition, a complete set of electric equipment is needed.

A complete set of foil electric equipment includes:

- An electric body cord, which runs under the fencer's jacket on his/her dominant side.
- An electric blade.
- A conductive lamé or electric vest.
- A conductive bib (often attached to the mask).
- An electric mask cord, connecting the conductive bib and the lamé.

The electric equipment of sabre is very similar to that of foil. In addition, equipment used in sabre includes:

- A larger conductive lame.
- An electric sabre.
- A completely conductive mask.
- A conductive glove or overlay.

Épée fencers lack a lamé, conductive bib, and head cord due to their target area. Also, their body cords are constructed differently as described above. However, they possess all of the other components of a foil fencer's equipment.

== Techniques ==
Techniques or movements in fencing can be divided into two categories: offensive and defensive. Some techniques can fall into both categories (e.g. the beat). Certain techniques are used offensively, with the purpose of landing a hit on one's opponent while holding the right of way (foil and sabre). Others are used defensively, to protect against a hit or obtain the right of way.

The attacks and defences may be performed in countless combinations of feet and hand actions. For example, fencer A attacks the arm of fencer B, drawing a high outside parry; fencer B then follows the parry with a high line riposte. Fencer A, expecting that, then makes his own parry by pivoting his blade under fencer B's weapon (from straight out to more or less straight down), putting fencer B's tip off target and fencer A now scoring against the low line by angulating the hand upwards.

=== Offensive ===
- Attack: A basic fencing technique, also called a thrust, consisting of the initial offensive action made by extending the arm and continuously threatening the opponent's target. There are four different attacks (straight thrust, disengage attack, counter-disengage attack and cutover). In sabre, attacks are also made with a cutting action.
- Riposte: An attack by the defender after a successful parry. After the attacker has completed their attack, and it has been parried, the defender then has the opportunity to make an attack, and (at foil and sabre) take right of way.
- Feint: A false attack with the purpose of provoking a reaction from the opposing fencer.
- Lunge: A thrust while extending the front leg by using a slight kicking motion and propelling the body forward with the back leg.
- Beat attack: In foil and sabre, the attacker beats the opponent's blade to gain priority (right of way) and continues the attack against the target area. In épée, a similar beat is made but with the intention to disturb the opponent's aim and thus score with a single light.
- Disengage: A blade action whereby the blade is moved around the opponent's blade to threaten a different part of the target or deceive a parry.
- Compound attack: An attack preceded by one or more feints which oblige the opponent to parry, allowing the attacker to deceive the parry.
- Continuation/renewal of Attack: A typical épée action of making a 2nd attack after the first attack is parried. This may be done with a change in line; for example, an attack in the high line (above the opponent's bell guard, such as the shoulder) is then followed with an attack to the low line (below the opponent's bell guard, such as the thigh, or foot); or from the outside line (outside the bell guard, such as outer arm) to the inside line (inside the bell guard, such as the inner arm or the chest). A second continuation is stepping slight past the parry and angulating the blade to bring the tip of the blade back on target. A renewal may also be direct (without a change of line or any further blade action), in which case it is called a remise. In foil or sabre, a renewal is considered to have lost right of way, and the defender's immediate riposte, if it lands, will score instead of the renewal.
- Flick: a technique used primarily in foil and épée. It takes advantage of the extreme flexibility of the blade to use it like a whip, bending the blade so that it curves over and strikes the opponent with the point; this allows the fencer to hit an obscured part of the target (e.g., the back of the shoulder or, at épée, the wrist even when it is covered by the guard). This technique has become much more difficult due to timing changes which require the point to stay depressed for longer to set off the light.
- Flèche: an offensive manoeuvre, in which the fencer leans forward past the point of balance, and then crosses their feet, running past the opponent after the touch is scored.
- Flunge: a technique used by sabreurs in which the attacker makes a flying lunge, as FIE rules state that crossing one's feet is illegal in Sabre.

=== Defensive ===
- Parry: Basic defence technique, block the opponent's weapon while it is preparing or executing an attack to deflect the blade away from the fencer's valid area and (in foil and sabre) to give fencer the right of way. Usually followed by a riposte, a return attack by the defender.
- Circle parry: A parry where the weapon is moved in a circle to catch the opponent's tip and deflect it away.
- Counter attack: A basic fencing technique of attacking one's opponent while generally moving back out of the way of the opponent's attack. Used quite often in épée to score against the attacker's hand/arm. More difficult to accomplish in foil and sabre unless one is quick enough to make the counterattack and retreat ahead of the advancing opponent without being scored upon, or by evading the attacking blade via moves such as the In Quartata (turning to the side) or Passata-sotto (ducking). Counterattacks can also be executed in opposition, grazing along the opponent's blade and deflecting it to cause the attack to miss.
- Point-in-line: A specific position where the arm is straight and the point is threatening the opponent's target area. In foil and sabre, this gives one priority if the extension is completed before the opponent begins the final action of their attack. When performed as a defensive action, the attacker must then disturb the extended weapon to re-take priority; otherwise the defender has priority and the point-in-line will win the touch if the attacker does not manage a single light. In épée, there is no priority; the move may be used as a means by either fencer to achieve a double-touch and advance the score by 1 for each fencer. In all weapons, the point-in-line position is commonly used to slow the opponent's advance and cause them to delay the execution of their attack.

== Other variants ==
Other variants include wheelchair fencing for those with disabilities, chair fencing, one-hit épée (one of the five events which constitute modern pentathlon) and the various types of non-Olympic competitive fencing. Chair fencing is similar to wheelchair fencing, but for the able bodied. The opponents set up opposing chairs and fence while seated; all the usual rules of fencing are applied. An example of the latter is the American Fencing League (distinct from the United States Fencing Association): the format of competitions is different and the right of way rules are interpreted in a different way. In a number of countries, school and university matches deviate slightly from the FIE format. A variant of the sport using toy lightsabers earned national attention when ESPN2 acquired the rights to a selection of matches and included it as part of its "ESPN8: The Ocho" programming block in August 2018.

Two handed fencing refers to a type of fencing where a buckler or dagger is used to parry attacks.

== In popular culture ==
One of the most notable films related to fencing is the 2015 Finnish-Estonian-German film The Fencer, directed by Klaus Härö, which is loosely based on the life of Endel Nelis, an accomplished Estonian fencer and coach. The film was nominated for the 73rd Golden Globe Awards in the Best Foreign Language Film category.

In 2017, the first issue of the Fence comic book series, which follows a fictional team of young fencers, was published by the US-based Boom! Studios.

== See also ==
- Glossary of fencing
- Outline of fencing
- List of fencers
- Kendo
- HEMA
- Buhurt
