= Lamé (fencing) =

Jacket used for detecting hits in fencing

The red depicts the location of the lamé

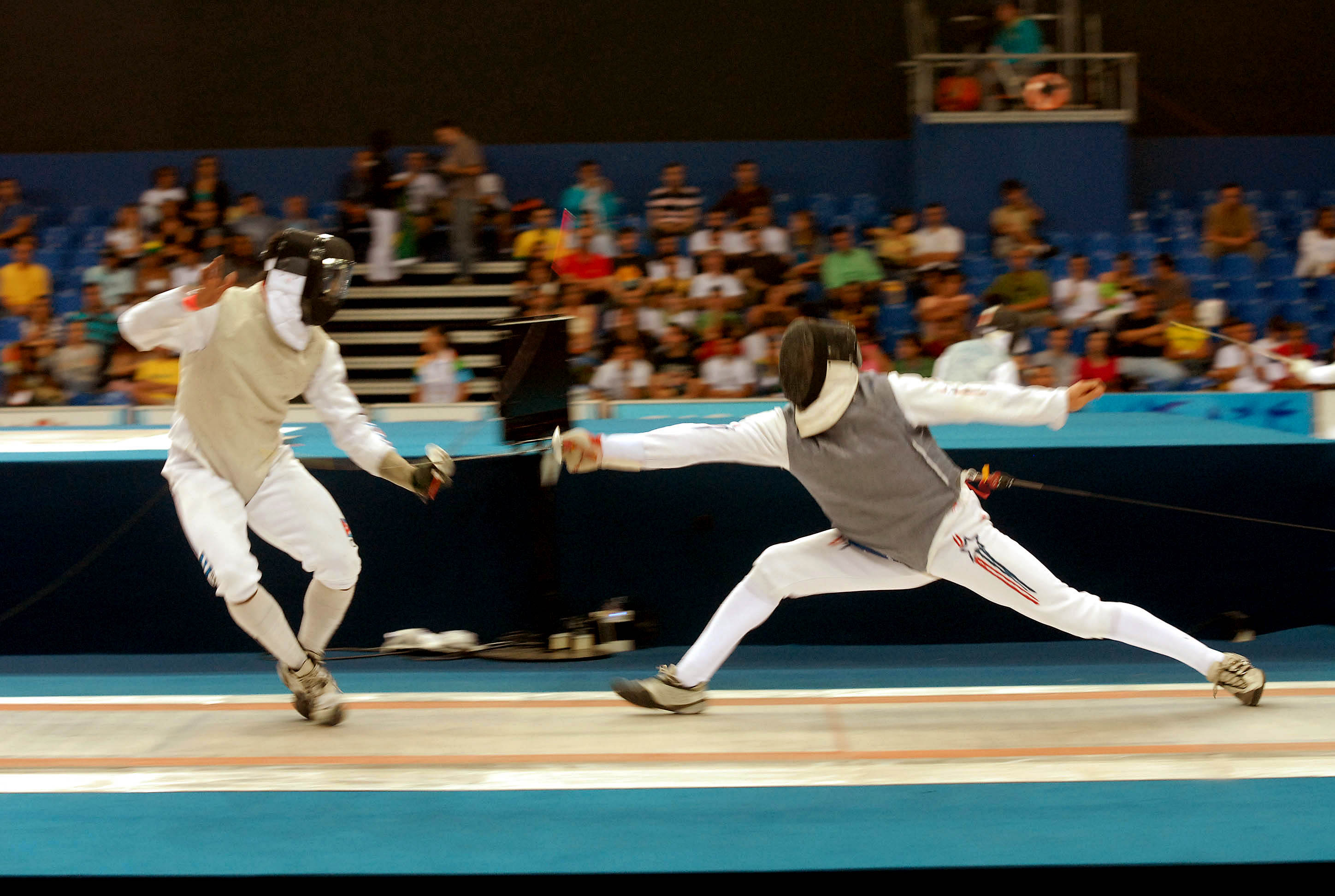
Foil fencers wearing different colored lamés

In modern fencing, a lamé is an electrically conductive jacket worn by foil and sabre fencers in order to define the scoring area and register contact with it. Lamés are wired by use of a body cord to a scoring machine, which allows the other person's weapon to register touches when their tips (or blades, in sabre) contact the lamé.

Lamés generally consist of a polyester jacket overlain with a thin, interwoven metal, usually steel or copper. This gives the lamés a metallic, gray appearance, but colored foil lamés have become increasingly popular. Lamés used in higher-level competitions usually have the last name and country of their owner printed in blue across the back.

Because the scoring area is different for each weapon, the lamé may cover more or less of the body depending on which weapon the fencer uses. In foil, the lamé extends on the torso from the shoulders to the groin area, including the back. In sabre, the lamé covers both arms, the torso from the shoulders to the waist, and the back. In addition, sabre fencers wear masks that allow them to register head touches, and manchettes, which are conductive glove covers, on their weapon hand. A lamé is not required in épée, since the target in épée is the whole body.
