= Glossary of fencing =

This is a glossary of terms used in fencing.

== A ==
Abstain
When a judge cannot tell if a touch was made.
Absence of blade
The situation in a bout when the opposing blades are not touching; opposite of engagement. Can also be strategic as in foil, if the blade is absent and right of way is acquired, absent blade can be used to maintain right of way.
Advance
The 'advance' is the basic forward movement. The front foot moves first, beginning by lifting the toes. The leg is straightened at the knee, pushing the heel out in front. Land on the heel, and then bring the back foot up to en garde stance. Also, the term advance is used in general for any movement forward by either step, cross, or ballestra.
Advance-Lunge
An advance followed immediately by a lunge. The extension can occur before or during the advance, but always before the lunge. A good long-distance attack, especially in combination with Handwork. An advance followed by a lunge might have a tempo of 1-2---3, but an advance-lunge should have a tempo of 1--2-3.
Allez!
Command used to commence action between fencers. French imperative meaning 'go' or 'come on!' Full phrase spoken at outset is En garde! Prêts? Allez! (For two female fencers, prêts becomes prêtes.)
Appel
Stamping the front foot to the ground, to produce a sound to distract or startle the opponent. This may be made during an advance, or directly from an en garde position. It may precede a lunge, or be used merely as a distraction. An appel is also sometimes called a 'half-advance'. This action may also be used to halt a bout, often by stamping the trailing foot insistently.
Arrêt à bon temps
see #Stop hit.
Assault
A friendly combat between two fencers, where score may or may not be kept, and is generally not a part of any competition. Formerly, public exhibitions (spectator events) were often conducted as assaults, rather than as round-robin or direct-elimination events, especially with a few fencers. (See also #Bout.)
Attack
The initial offensive action made by extending the sword arm and continuously threatening the valid target of the opponent with the point (or blade at sabre).
Attaque au fer
(Archaic) An attack on the opponent's blade, such as a #beat attack. Also see #Prise de fer.
Avertissement
(French) A warning; used to indicate a minor rule infraction by one of the fencers. See #Yellow card.

== B ==
Backsword
A type of historical heavy sabre, not used in contemporary fencing, generally single-edged with a ‘false edge’ down the top third of the back of the blade. Typified by a basket hilt. In use from the 16th to 20th centuries.
Balestra
A footwork consisting of a jump forwards immediately followed by a lunge. The jump is very short, a foot or less. Both feet land together, heels off the floor, at least as close to each other as in the original guard. Landing thus increases the elasticity of the legs (generated mainly by the arches of both feet) for the immediate forthcoming lunge. The balestra may be used as a way of altering the tempo of the fencing phrase.
Beat
A simple preparatory motion. A sharp controlled blow to the middle or 'weak' of the opponents blade, with the objective of provoking a reaction or creating an opening. The action should knock the opponent's blade aside or out of line.
Beat parry
The parry of an incoming thrust or attack using a beat to deflect the opponents blade, creating an opening for a riposte.
Bind
also Lie, Liement; An action in which one fencer forces the opponent's blade into the diagonally opposite line, (that is, from high line to low line on the opposite side, or vice versa) by taking it with the guard and forte of their own blade. See also #Prise de fer.
Black card
A severe penalty. A black card is used to indicate the most serious offences in a fencing competition. The offending fencer is expelled immediately from the event or tournament, regardless of whether they had any prior warnings. A black card can also be used to expel a third party disrupting the match.
Body cord
The insulated wire that runs under a fencer's jacket, connecting the electrical competition weapon to the reel, and thence to the scoring machine. The body cord also connects to the lamé causing it to become conductive.
Bout
An assault at which the score is kept. Usually refers to a match between two fencers in a competition. This is the term used in the US to generally denote any combat between fencers, replacing the terms match and assault.
Broadsword
A type of historical military sword and fencing weapon popular in the 18th and 19th centuries, similar to a heavy sabre. Beginning only in the late 20th century, this term came to be inappropriately applied to almost any straight-bladed, double-edged, single-handed cutting sword, especially of the Medieval and Renaissance eras. The broadsword is not used in contemporary fencing.
Broken-time
A preparation done in the middle of an attack made with the intention of eliciting a reaction (typically an attempted parry) that provides an opening for the fencer to score a touch with either a new attack, remise, or reprise. Example: Fencer A makes a lunge but withdraws their arm during the lunge; Fencer B attempts to parry fencer A's lunge but fails to because fencer A withdrew their arm/blade. Fencer A makes an immediate remise against Fencer B who is now vulnerable.

== C ==
Ceding parry
A method of parrying an offensive action executed by prise-de-fer or in opposition. The defender rotates their blade around their opponent's during the final stages of the offensive action and thus deflects it from the target in the same line as the offensive action was directed. Cf. #Opposition.
Change of engagement
An engagement of the opponent's blade in the opposite line. Changes of engagement are sometimes performed to place one fencer's blade on the side of the opponent's blade that they feel has an advantage, or could be just to fool with the opponent. Often, a bout with a left-handed fencer versus a right-handed will see both of them jockey for position with changes of engagements.
Circle-beat
Also counter-beat or change-beat. A beat that is preceded by a circle under the opponent's blade. This can provoke a reaction with a beat from an unexpected quarter.
Circle-parry
also counter-parry. A parry that moves in a circle to end up in the same position in which it started. A circle-parry usually traps an attack coming in a different line, but in the same high/low line. Thus, the parry 'Circle-Six' (circular outside-high) is effective against attacks in the Four line (inside-high). While commonly referred to as a "counter-parry," due to the circular motion of the parry, a circle parry does not necessarily need to be done in response to a riposte.
Compound attack
Also composed attack. An attack or riposte incorporating one or more feints to the opposite line that the action finishes in. A compound attack does not necessarily lose right of way during its execution; it just comprises more than one indirect action. Compound attacks are usually used to draw multiple reactions from an opponent, or against an opponent who uses complex parries. A counter-attack into a compound attack must hit a clear tempo ahead of the compound attack to be valid.
Corps-à-corps
(French 'body-to-body') The action of two fencers coming into physical contact with one another with any portion of their bodies or hilts. This is illegal in foil and sabre bouts, and is cause for the referee (director) to halt the fencing action. In épée, it does not violate the spirit of the game, but contact may not be accompanied with any brutality or forcefulness (intentional or not).
Coulé
(Archaic) Also graze, glisé, or glissade. An attack or feint that slides along the opponent's blade. In performing a sliding action along the opponent’s blade, it is generally the goal to establish leverage by moving forte against foible, or forte to forte. Also see, #Prise de fer.
Counter-attack
An attack made against, or into, an attack initiated by the opponent. In foil and sabre, a counter-attack does not have the right-of-way against the opponent’s initiated attack. Counter-attacking is a common tactic in épée, where one may gain a touch by hitting first, and avoiding the opponent’s attack. Counter-attacks, especially in épée, are often accompanied by an action on the blade (beat, opposition, prise-de-fer, transfer).
Counter-parry
A second, third, or further parry done in the fencing 'phrase,' typically against a #riposte or counter-riposte, and often as a result of #Second-intention.
Counter-riposte
A second, third, or further riposte in a fencing 'phrase' or encounter. A counter-riposte is the offensive action following the parry of any riposte. They are numbered so that the riposte is the offensive action following the parry of the attack, counterattack or renewal, the first counter-riposte is the offensive action following the parry of the riposte, the second counter-riposte follows the parry of the first counter-riposte, and so on.
Counter-time
Attempting to score by provoking an opponent to make a defensive reaction then defending against that reaction. Example: Fencer executes an attack which will purposefully fall short (see #False attack), provoking a #Stop hit from the opponent, then responding to the #Stop hit with a #Parry and #Riposte.
Coup d'arrêt
see #Stop hit.
Coupé
also cut-over. Another indirect attack, being an attack or deception that passes around the opponent's tip. Following a feint, the blade is pulled up and over the opponent's parrying blade. In foil, this requires use of the fingers and wrist only, since moving the blade backwards at any time during this move invalidates the established right-of-way. Done in proper time, and with proper distance, with the point never being moved backwards, the cut-over retains right-of-way during its entire execution.
Croisé
(Archaic) also cross, semi-bind; an action in which one fencer forces the opponent's blade into the high or low line on the same side, by taking it with the guard and forte of their own blade. See also #Transfer, #Coulé, #Prise de fer.
Cross over
An advance or retreat by crossing one leg over the other; see also #Pass forward (passé avant) and #Pass backwards (passe arriere). In sabre, crossing the feet while moving forwards is prohibited.
Cut
An attack made with the edge of the blade. Cuts, that is, attempts to hit with the edge, are only valid in sabre. It is not a chopping movement as those are used to transmit impulse which is advisable for point heavy weapons like axes and maces only.

== D ==
Debile or Debole
(Archaic) See #Foible.
Derobement
An avoidance of an attempt to take the blade. A derobement is a reaction to the opponent's attempt to entrap, beat, press or take the blade, in a circular, lateral, vertical or diagonal motion.
Detachment in a parry
A method of executing a riposte (or counter-riposte) by leaving contact with the opponent's blade. Cf. #Opposition.
Direct
An attack or riposte that finishes in the same line in which it was formed, with no feints out of that line.
Director
(also Directeur) A term no longer commonly used in English referring to the referee in a bout. In foil and sabre, the director determines the priority of touches according to the rules of right of way; the director is also responsible for enforcing rules. See #Referee.
Disengage
A type of feint. Disengages are usually executed in conjunction with an extension/attack, though technically, they are just a deception around the opponent’s blade. To use in an attack, feint an attack with an extension and avoid the opponent's attempt to parry or press the blade, using as small a circular motion as possible. Circle under the opponent's blade. The first extension must be a believable feint in order to draw a reaction. Be prepared to proceed forward with a straight attack if no parry response is forthcoming.
Displacement
Moving the target to avoid an attack; dodging.
Double touch
A double touch. In épée, two attacks that arrive within 40 ms of each other, resulting in a touch for both opponents. This time margin is handled by the scoring machines, which lock out any touches after the time limit. In foil and saber double touches use right of way to determine who is awarded the touch.
Doublé
A compound offensive action that describes a complete circle around the opponent's blade, and finishes in the opposite line. The full circle is done in reaction to the opponent’s attempt to parry the attack with one or more parries, generally circular in nature. An attempt to perform a doublé against an opponent who does not parry results in the attack running onto the opponent’s blade, and parrying itself. For a compound action deceiving lateral or semi-circular parries, see #One-two
Dry (USA) / Steam (UK)
Fencing without electric scoring aids. "Dry" weapons have plastic or rubber buttons on the tips.

== E ==
Engagement
During an encounter between two fencers, the point at which the fencers are close enough to join blades, or to make an effective attack. Blade contact is also referred to as an engagement, whether just standing there, during a parry, attack au fer, or prise de fer.
En garde
Spoken at outset to alert fencers to take defensive positions. Full commencing phrase is En garde! Prêts? Allez! ('On guard! Ready? Go!' For two female fencers, prêts becomes prêtes.)
Envelopment
An action to seize the opponent's blade in one line and lead it (without losing contact) through a full circle to end in the same line. See also #Prise de fer.

An Épée fencer. Valid target (the entire body) is in red.

Épée
A fencing weapon with triangular cross-section blade and a large bell guard; also a light dueling sword of similar design, popular in the mid-19th century, which was also called an Épée de terrain.
Esquive
(Archaic) An evasive move to dodge or sidestep the attacker’s attack, generally followed with an attack of one's own.
Extension
The simplest action of attacking. A simple offensive action, consisting of extending the weapon arm forward. The point should move in the smoothest possible line towards the target, without wavering. Excess motion can ruin the control needed for precise, consistent hits.

== F ==
False attack
An attack that is intended to miss or fall short, so as to produce a reaction from the opponent.
Feint
An offensive movement resembling an attack in all but its continuance. It is an attack into one line with the intention of switching to another line before the attack is completed. A feint is intended to draw a reaction from an opponent. This is the ‘intention’, and the reaction is generally a parry, which can then be deceived.
Flèche
Flèche means 'arrow' in French. The rear leg is brought in front of the front leg and the fencer sprints past the opponent. This action is currently not allowed during sabre bouts, because the front and rear legs must not cross. In épée, a quick pass is essential, since the defending fencer is allowed one attack after the pass, so long as the defender's attack is in one action, with or without a parry, initiated before the pass is completed.
Flick
A cut that lands with the point, often involving some whip of the foible of the blade to strike at a concealed target. In foil and épée, flick attacks often start out without the point directly threatening the target area, and comes in with a circular action, to allow the blade to bend at the end of the attack, placing the point on target, possibly by whipping past a parry.
Flunge
A portmanteau of flèche and lunge – a 'saber flèche'. Rather the fencer starts as if with a flèche, but ends with a hop, skipping past the opponent. The rear leg is not brought in front of the front leg to ensure compliance with the rules.
Foible
The top third of the blade. This section of the blade is weaker in terms of leverage, and is used for beats, presses, and other motions where speed is needed and leverage is not crucial.

A foil fencer. Valid target (the torso) is in red.

Foil
A fencing weapon with rectangular cross-section blade and a small bell guard. More generally, any sword that has been buttoned or had its point turned back to render it less dangerous for practice.
Forte
The forte (French pronunciation: [fɔrt]) is the bottom third of the blade, so named for the strength in leverage that it provides. Fencers should always perform parries with the forte and never hit opponents with it.
Forward recovery
A recovery from a lunge, performed by pulling the rear leg up into en garde, rather than pulling the front leg and body backwards. Can be used to gain ground on the opponent more secretly than a standard advance, and when used sparingly can surprise the opponent by changing the expected distance between fencers.
French grip
A traditional hilt with a slightly curved grip and a large pommel.

== G ==
Great sword
also two-handed sword. A very large historical cutting sword, not used in contemporary fencing, generally double-edged, intended for use with both hands. Great swords could be as tall as the swordsman, and were often used as front-line offensive weapons in late 17th-century warfare.
Guard
also bell and bell guard. A cup-shaped metal (steel or aluminum) weapon part which protects the hand. Foils use small concentrically mounted bell guards, épées use larger offset-mounted bell guards, and sabres have a knuckle guard that wraps around the hilt to protect from cuts to the hand.

== H ==
Halt!
An order spoken by the referee or director of a fencing bout in order to direct the fencers to cease fencing.
Hilt
The part of the sword held by the fencer. Comprises the guard (be it a basket, bell guard, quillons, etc.), the grip (see French grip, Italian grip, #pistol grip), and the pommel. Italian grip weapons will also have quillions and a ricasso as a part of the hilt.

== I ==
In-fighting
Fencing at closed distance, where the distance between the two fencers is such that the weapon must be withdrawn before the point can threaten or hit the target.
In-time
An attack which is correctly executed.
Indirect
An attack or riposte that finishes in a line different from that in which it was formed.
Inside
The direction to the front of the body. (The left for a right-hander.)
Insistence
Forcing an attack through the parry, using strength.
Invitation
A line that is intentionally left open to encourage the opponent to attack.
Italian grip
A traditional hilt with finger rings and crossbar. Used only in foil and épée. The Italian grip provides more grip than the French grip, but less than a pistol-grip. The finger rings and crossbar are descendants of the swords that used quillions.

== J ==
Jury
The four officials, or judges, who watch for hits in a dry fencing bout. The judges watch for hits on the fencer opposite their end of the strip. A judge acknowledges a hit by raising their hand, attracting the attention of the referee (or president of the jury). A judge cannot interpret the right-of-way (foil and sabre), only vote on the touches as described by the referee. In electronically scored foil bouts, hand-judges can be used to watch for a fencer who may be covering valid target area with the unarmed hand. The jury is hardly used anymore due to electric fencing and replays where the referee can watch again to see who made the touch.

== L ==
Lamé
The electrically conductive jacket worn by foil and sabre fencers. In foil, the lamé extends on the torso from the shoulders to the groin area. It also covers the back. In sabre, the lamé covers both arms, the torso from the shoulders to the waist, and the back. Sabreurs also wear a conductive glove cover called a manchette on their weapon hand. The lamé is connected to the body cord with an alligator clip causing it to be conductive.
Line
The main direction of an attack (e.g., high/low, inside/outside), often equated to the parry that must be made to deflect the attack; see also #Point-in-line.
Lines
The means of referring to a position or area on a fencer's body. The idea behind 'lines' is that the torso, as facing the viewer in 'en garde' is bisected both laterally and vertically. There are then four quadrants of the body. The quadrants which are above the lateral line are referred to as high line, those below as low line. The fencer's left-hand-side, referred to as chest, is the inside. The fencer's right-hand-side, referred to as flank, is the outside. This is reversed for left-handed fencers. The lower chest side quadrant is then referred to as 'inside low line'. The common parries in foil and epée are: sixte (outside-high), quarte (inside-high), octave (outside-low), and septieme (inside-low). Angled (up-and-down) parries can also be used. In sabre, tierce replaces sixte to guard the inside-high line, quarte becomes more erect, seconde replaces octave on the inside-low line, and prime replaces septime. Quinte is used in sabre to protect the head.
Longsword
also hand-and-a-half sword. A larger cutting sword, not used in contemporary fencing, that could be use with one or two hands. Manuals detailing the use of such swords are among the earliest extant, dating back to the 14th century.
Lunge
The most basic and common attacking movement in modern fencing. This description adheres basically to the French school of fencing, and describes the legwork involved. The actions of the hand/arm/blade are considered separately from this discussion. From en garde, push the front heel out by extending the front leg from the knee. Do not bend the front ankle, or lift up on the ball of the front foot. This means that the front foot must move forward prior to the body weight shifting forward. As the front leg extends, energetically push erect body forward with the rear leg. Rear arm extends during forward motion as a counterbalance. Land on the front heel and glide down into final position, with front shin perpendicular to the ground, and both heels on the floor. During this action, the torso should remain relatively erect, and not be thrown forward. Often, the back foot can be pulled along behind during an energetic lunge. It is important, and a fundamental characteristic of the lunge, to fully extend the back leg, obtaining full power from this spring-like extension. Aldo Nadi, of the Italian school of fencing, wrote an extensive description of how the lunge should be executed.

== M ==
Manchette
A special glove-cover worn by sabre fencers on their weapon hand. Covered by a type of brocaded fabric with inwoven metal threads that serve as a conductive surface that aids in the practice of electric fencing, the manchette is worn on the hand and wrist. The manchette is conductive up to but not exceeding the wrist area. It is worn in conjunction with a lamé.
Maraging steel
A special steel alloy used for making blades rated for international competition. Usually stronger and more durable than conventional carbon-steel blades, but more importantly, it tends to break less frequently than carbon-steel blades. This is because propagation of micro-cracks in the blade is approximately 10 times slower in maraging steel than in carbon-steel. It is a fencing urban myth that a maraging steel blade is designed to break flat; the breakage patterns are identical: both maraging and non-maraging blades break with the same degree of jaggedness. The sole reason for requiring a maraging steel blade (or a non-maraging one that has the same longevity under FIE testing) is that fewer blade breaks means less potential for follow-on injury.
Match
The aggregate of bouts between two fencing teams.
Moulinet
In sabre, a circular cut. A moulinet often consists of a parry, usually prime or seconde, moving thence into a circular cut. This action, while flashy and impressive, is slow (since the action pivots around the wrist and elbow) and is rarely used in modern sabre. In historical fencing, this is the circular motion of the fighter's blade around the opponent's blade. The hilt does not move during this maneuver.

== N ==
Neuvieme
Parry #9 (literally, French for 'ninth'); blade behind the back, pointing down; alternatively, similar to elevated sixte. Originally used in sabre, to defend the back against a passing or overtaking opponent. Covers the outside line on the back.

== O ==
Octave
Parry #8; blade down and to the outside, wrist supinated. The point is lower than the hand. Covers the outside low line.
On Guard
See #En garde.
One-two
A compound offensive action consisting of a disengage feint followed by a disengage to deceive a lateral, diagonal or semi-circular parry. See also #Doublé.
Opposition parry
deflecting the incoming attack without ever losing contact with the blade from the initial engagement.
Opposition
1. A method of executing an offensive or counter-offensive action whereby the fencer maintains blade contact throughout the action in order to control the opponent's weapon and prevent it from hitting. Cf. #Detachment in a parry.
2. An opposition parry is a parry taken against an offensive action executed by prise-de-fer or in opposition, which maintains contact with the blade and pushes against the opponent's action, deflecting it into the laterally opposite line from that in which it was directed. Opposition parries are correctly executed by using leverage rather than strength to deflect the incoming blade. Cf. #Ceding parry.
Outside
The direction away from the front of the body. (The right for a right-hander.)

== P ==
Parry
A simple defensive action designed to deflect an attack, performed with the forte of the blade. A parry is usually only wide enough to allow the attacker's blade to just miss; any additional motion is wasteful. A well-executed parry should take the foible of the attacker's blade with the forte and/or guard of the defender's. This provides the greatest control over the opponent's blade. In sabre, the guard should be turned appropriately using the fingers to protect the wrist. Parries generally cover one of the 'lines' of the body. The simplest parries move the blade in a straight line. Other parries move the blade in a circular, semicircular, or diagonal manner. There are eight basic parries, and many derivatives of these eight. (see #Prime, #Seconde, #Tierce, #Quarte, #Quinte, #Sixte, #Septime, #Octave, #Neuvieme). See also #Lines. In foil, the opponent's blade should not only be deflected away from the target, but away from off-target areas as well. An attack that is deflected off the valid target but onto invalid target still retains right-of-way. In sabre, the opponent's blade need only be deflected away from valid target, since off-target touches do not stop the phrase. Sabre parries must be particularly clean and clear to avoid the possibility of whip-over touches. In épée, a good parry is simply any one that gains enough time for the riposte; opposition parries and prise-de-fer are commonly used, since they do not release the opponent's blade to allow a remise.
Pass backwards
Also passe arriere. A backwards footwork action. The front foot moves behind the rear foot on the body's outside. Landing on the ball of the front foot, the rear foot moves backwards to the 'en garde' stance.
Pass forward
Also passe avant, or cross forward. A forwards footwork action. The rear foot moves in front of forward foot on the body's inside. From the crossed position, the front foot moves forward into the 'en garde' stance. Note: Passing forward is illegal in sabre.
Patinando
There are two types of patinandos, speed and tempo. They are advance lunges but with different tempos. The speed patinando is a fast step and a lunge, while the tempo patinando is a slow step (to get a slow response from one's opponent) and a fast lunge.
Passé
An attack that passes the target without hitting.
Pistol grip
A modern, orthopedic grip, often shaped vaguely like a small pistol (generally with more protrusions than a real pistol’s grip). Varieties are known by names such as Belgian, German, Russian, and Visconti. Orthopedic grips were introduced to aid a fencer who has lost some fingers and was unable to use a traditional grip.
Plastron
Also underarm protector. A partial garment worn under the jacket for padding or for safety. Usually Consists of a sleeve and a chest/abdomen covering, which provides additional padding and protection. An underarm plastron is seamless under the weapon arm, providing no weak seams for a broken blade to rip through. An over-plastron is worn to provide additional padding.
Point
In foil and épée, the point is the only part of the blade with which to score points. The point may also be used in sabre.
Pointe d'arrêt
In electric fencing, the spring-loaded component that completes the button at the tip of the blade. Historically, the point d'arrêt named a three-pointed prong attachment that could catch on the opponent's clothing, used in competitive fencing to better simulate the catch of a sharp weapon.
Point-in-line
An established threat made with the extended arm. A point-in-line is a static threat, created by one fencer by extending the weapon and arm prior to any actions in a phrase. In foil and sabre, a point-in-line has right of way, therefore, if the line is not withdrawn, any attack launched by the opponent does not have right of way. This can be likened to a spear poking up from the ground: if one throws oneself upon it, one has only oneself to blame. A successful attack on the blade will invalidate a point-in-line or cause the opponent to withdraw their arm. In épée, point-in-line has no right of way advantages, but is still an effective tactic.
Pommel
Derives from the old French word for 'apple'. This fastener affixes the grip and guard to the tang of the blade. It has female threading, but unlike a nut the threaded hole does not pass through. It is screwed onto the distal end of the tang, locking guard, grip and electric connector is position by compression and friction. The pommel traditionally acts as a counterweight on non-orthopedic grips of foils and épées, and on all sabres. In electric sabre, it is covered with plastic as to not interfere with the detection of valid hits by allowing stray currents. Orthopedic (pistol-grip) weapons use only a pommel nut, usually fitting inside a cylindrical hole in the grip.
Pomelling (Posting)
The technique of gripping a weapon's handle closer to the pommel in order to extend the fencer's reach by a few inches. Posting is a trade-off: the fencer loses a little control over their blade work in return for the greater reach. This is most commonly done in épée, where there is no need to establish right of way and hitting first can award the touch. Technically it is not legal to slide the hand down the grip during an offensive action (see FIE t.16), so a fencer who wishes to post must do it while the action is stopped, or they risk a possible penalty.
Preparation
Any action that precedes the actual launch of an attack. Preparation usually consists of actions against the opponent's blade to take it out of line, or to provoke a reaction. In foil and sabre, any action that occurs during a phrase or conversation that precedes the establishment of right-of-way on the part of a fencer, often accompanied with a movement forward. In calling the actions in a foil or sabre bout, a referee may indicate preparation on the part of one fencer, meaning the fencer was moving forward without establishing right-of-way, and was vulnerable to an attack made during this time.
Presentation
Offering one's blade for engagement by the opponent.
Press
Also pressure. An attempt to push the opponent's blade aside or out of line from engaged blades. A press can precede a direct or indirect attack, depending on the opponent's reaction, but should be followed by an immediate threat (a full or partial extension). A press which is not followed by a threat may invite a disengage from the opponent, and an attack thereby. From an engagement, press smoothly on the opponent's foible, taking their blade out of line, and perhaps provoking a response. The thumb and fingers should provide the force behind this action.
Prêts
French adjective for 'ready'. Spoken by the director at outset to ask if fencers are ready to fight. Full commencing phrase is En garde! Prêts? Allez! (For two female fencers, prêts becomes prêtes.)
Prime
Parry #1: blade down and to the inside, wrist pronated. The point is significantly lower than the hand. Covers the inside low-line. (This is a rare sabre parry.)
Priority
In sabre and foil, the rules that decide which fencer will be awarded the touch in the event that they both attack simultaneously; sometimes used synonymously with "right-of-way."
In the 1995 revision of the rules for all weapons, priority also refers to rules dealing with a tie score. Priority is awarded when time expires with a tied score. The priority is determined by the flip of a coin at the start of the last minute, and the winner of the toss wins the bout if the score is tied when time expires.
Prise de Fer
(French: literally 'take the steel'); also taking the blade; an engagement of the blades that attempts to control the opponent's weapon. See also #Beat, #Press, #Expulsion, #Bind, #Croisé, #Envelopment, #Opposition, #Transfer.
Pronation
Having the hand in a position where the palm faces downwards. See #Supination.

== Q ==
Quarte
Parry #4; blade up and to the inside, wrist supinated. The point is higher than the hand. Covers the inside high line.
Quillion
Also quillon, cross-guard. A cross-bar style guard not utilized in modern fencing. The quillions (usually two), on historical swords, extend from the top of the hilt, perpendicular to the line of the blade, on the same plane as the edge(s) of the blade. In simple medieval swords, the quillions usually form the entire guard. In later, more complex hilts, rings and other protective structures were extended in front of the quillions. One or two fingers can be wrapped above the quillions, providing better control of the weapon but endangering some fingers. In Olympic fencing weapons, the Italian grip is the only one that retains quillions.
Quinte
Parry #5; blade up and to the inside, wrist pronated. The point is higher than the hand. This parry, more than any other, is subject to different interpretations in different schools (in foil and épée). In foil and épée, this parry generally covers the inside high line, since the pronated wrist can push further down than the supinated wrist (in Quarte). If the point and hand are lifted, this parry can also cover the inside low line with a sweeping action upwards, carrying the opponents point over the outside shoulder. In sabre, the blade is held above the head to protect from head cuts, but should still point slightly forward ready for riposte.

== R ==
Rapier
A long, double-edged thrusting sword, not used in modern fencing, popular in the 16th and 17th centuries. Rapiers began as swords which were designed to use the point, in addition to heavy cuts. Some consider the estoc a precursor to the rapier. As the styles of combat changed, and heavy armor was lightened, the rapier became more focused on the use of the point, and less on heavy cutting strokes. Hilts were designed to allow the forefinger to wrap around a quillion and provide better control. Hilts could be of complex 'swept-hilt' design, or shaped like a deep cup.
Recovery
A return to en garde stance from any other position, generally by pulling backwards into en garde. Recovery from a lunge occurs by reversing the motions in a lunge, and recovering the extended arm last of all. A forward recovery involves moving the rear foot forward to return to en garde. For a center recovery, both feet move towards the center simultaneously.
Red card
Used to indicate repeated minor rule infractions or a major rule infraction by one of the fencers; results in a point being given to the other fencer, and often the annulment of any touch which would have been made by the offending fencer.
Redoublement
An additional offensive action made after a previous offensive action (attack, riposte, counterattack or renewal) has failed and made with some further blade action, such as feints and disengages. See also #Renewal, #Remise and #Reprise.
Referee
also director, president. The mediator of the fencing bout.
Renewal
An offensive action made immediately after a previous offensive action has missed or been parried. There are three types of renewal: the #Remise (direct), the #Redoublement (indirect or compound) and the #Reprise (made after returning to the en garde position).
Remise
An immediate, direct replacement of an attack that missed, was short, or was parried, without withdrawing the arm. A remise is a direct continuation, meaning that no deceptions or changes of line occur with the continuation (replacement) of the attack. In foil and sabre, a remise does not have right of way over an immediate riposte. See also #Renewal, #Reprise and #Redoublement.
Reprise
A new attack executed immediately after a return to the en garde position. Specifically, this most often refers to the movement of bringing up the back foot from the lunge and lunging again to renew the attack against an opponent who caused the initial attack to miss by retreating. A reprise may be direct, indirect, or compound. See also #Renewal, #Remise and #Redoublement.
Retreat
The basic backwards movement. Rear foot reaches backwards and is firmly planted, then front leg pushes body weight backwards smoothly into 'en garde' stance.
Right-of-way
The rules for awarding the point in the event of a double touch in foil or sabre. The concept involved in being the first to establish a valid threat to an opponent's target area. Extending is the usual means to establishing this threat. Breaking the extended arm during an attack means relinquishing right-of-way. An opponent can take right-of-way by parrying the opponent's blade.
Riposte
1. An attack made immediately after a parry of the opponent's attack.
2. An attack with right-of-way following a valid parry. A simple (or direct) riposte goes straight from the parry position to the target. A riposte may attack in any line. Consider its equivalent in a conversation.

== S ==
A sabre fencer. Valid target (everything from the waist up, including the arms and head) is in red.

Sabre
A fencing weapon with a flat blade and knuckle guard, used with cutting or thrusting actions; a military sword popular in the 18th to 20th centuries; any cutting sword used by cavalry. The modern fencing sabre is descended from the dueling sabre of Italy and Germany, which was straight and thin with sharp edges, but had a blunt end.
Salle
(French: 'room') A fencing hall or club.
Salut des armes
A sort of choreographed demonstration of arms, consisting of sets of fencers saluting, attacking, parrying, drilling and performing set routines in chorus.
Salute
1. A blade action performed before a bout or lesson. Indicates respect and good sportsmanship. A handshake is usually exchanged after a bout.
2. A gesture of respect and civility performed with the weapon. Performed at the start and end of a bout (match, assault, etc.), and also at the start and end of a lesson. At the start of a bout, it is traditional, and expected, to salute the adversary, the referee of the bout, any additional judges for the bout, and then, optionally, others (the timekeeper, scorekeeper, etc.). The FIE rules now state that failure to salute an opponent and shake their hand at the end of a bout is an offense punishable by a black card - meaning elimination from the competition.
Second-intention
In general, a term used to imply that the first action initiated is not the one intended to score. The fencer may initiate a move, anticipating (or intending to draw) a certain response from the opponent, against which a second action is planned. For example, lunge attack (anticipating that it will be parried), parry the riposte, and hit with a counter-riposte.
Seconde
Parry #2; blade down and to the outside, wrist pronated. The point is significantly lower than the hand. Covers the outside low line in sabre, replacing octave.
Semicircular parry
A parry that moves from a high line to a low line, or vice versa. The parry can also cross the body. The parry must be made in a semicircle to provide the enveloping movement needed to trap the attacking blade.
Septime
Parry #7; blade down and to the inside, wrist supinated. The point is lower than the hand. Covers the inside low line.
Simple
An attack or riposte that involves no feints.
Simultaneous
In foil and sabre, two attacks for which the right-of-way is too close to determine.
Sixte
Parry #6; blade up and to the outside, wrist supinated. The point is higher than the hand. Covers the outside high line. This is generally the parry taught as the basic en garde position in foil and épée.
Smallsword
Also court sword. A light duelling sword, not used in modern fencing, popular in the 18th century. These were, as often as not, a fashion accessory as much as a gentleman’s weapon, and were decorated as such. The Foil was developed as a training sword for smallsword practice.
Stop hit
also stop thrust, stop-in-time. A counter-attack that attempts to take advantage of an uncertain attack. A properly performed stop hit allows a fencer to counter-attack into an oncoming attack, hit the opponent, and then still parry the oncoming attack (allowing a possible valid riposte as well). It may try to break the continuance of an attack by 'stopping' into it. However, it is still a counter-attack, and does not have right-of-way against a continuous attack.
Strip (piste)
The fencing area, 14 metres (46 ft) long and between 1.5 and 2 metres (4.9 and 6.6 ft) wide. Going off the side of the strip with one foot or both halts the fencing action and gets a penalty of the loss of 1 metre (3.3 ft). The last 2 metres (6.6 ft) on each end are hash-marked, to warn a fencer before they back off the end of the strip. Going off the back of the piste with both feet results in a hit being awarded to the opponent. After each touch, fencers begin again at the center of the strip, 4 metres (13 ft) apart.
Supination
The position of the hand when the palm is facing up. See #Pronation.

== T ==
Target area
The area delimited for valid hits in that weapon. Foil target area consists of the entire torso, including the groin and the bottom of the mask which covers the lame, and down to the waist in back. Head, arms and legs are considered off-target in foil. Épée uses the entire body for target. Sabre uses all the body area above the waist, except the hands and the back of the head.
Third intention
There is first intention which is a simple attack or thrust. There is second intention in which the attacker seeks to deceive their opponent before the actual thrust. Third intention goes further with two or more actions intended to deceive or place the defender in a position favorable to the attacker. Aldo Nadi stated in his book On Fencing that "The great fencer uses the latter (2nd intention) predominantly, exploiting their value and comparative safety to the utmost. But this is not all. Against intelligent adversaries, he frequently uses the third and even the fourth intention"
Three prong
A type of épée body wire/connector; also an old-fashioned tip that would snag clothing to make it easier to detect hits in the pre-electric era.
Thrust
An attack made by moving the sword parallel to its length and landing with the point.
Tierce
Parry #3; blade up and to the outside, wrist pronated. The point is significantly higher than the hand. Covers the outside high line. This is the basic en garde position in sabre.
Touche
The French word for 'touch' (French pronunciation: [tuʃ]). Used by the referee to declare that a touch has been made. The phrase pas de touche (French pronunciation: [pɑ də tuʃ]; English: 'no touch') indicates that the hit should not be counted.
Touché
Touché (French pronunciation: [tuˈʃe]): the French word for 'touched' is used to acknowledge a hit, called out by the fencer who is hit.
Trompement
(Archaic) The action of hitting an opponent at the end of a feint, after a successful deception.
Two prong
A type of body-wire/connector, used in foil and sabre.

== V ==
Volt
Thrust-avoiding leap

== W ==
Whip-over
In sabre, a touch that results from the foible of the blade whipping over the opponent's guard or blade when parried. Whip-overs are usually not counted, and formerly were a way of saying that even though the blade hit, it was parried prior to body contact, and was not valid. However, with the advent of electric sabre, whip-overs are being allowed more often. The FIE has resolved this by introducing a new standard of stiffness for sabre blades (put into effect in 1999).

== Y ==
Yellow card
also avertissement, 'warning'. Used to indicate a minor rule infraction by one of the fencers.
Yielding parry
deflecting the incoming attack by maintaining contact with the blade and changing the point of contact between the blades, moving from a position of poor leverage to one using the forte for strong leverage.

== Historical and foreign fencing terminology ==
Note that the vocabulary here is primarily a glossary of modern fencing terms. Over time, the terminology has evolved, and different terminology may be found in Medieval and Renaissance sources. In many cases, English, French, Italian, and even German terminology may be used (often interchangeably) for the same thing. It should also be noted that American and British English differ in several points of fencing terminology, though some effort has been made in this article to indicate both conventions.

== German ==
en Garde
phrase /ɛn gaːʁdɛ/
1. Spoken by the director at outset to alert fencers to take their positions. From French en garde. Full commencing phrase is En Garde. Fertig? Los!
fertig
adjective
1. Spoken by the director at outset to ask if fencers are ready to fence. Full commencing phrase is En Garde. Fertig? Los!
2. 'ready, prepared'
Krumb
German medieval fencing term for a curving pass of the blade, as opposed to a straight blade action, the Cross, Quer or Twer.
los
interjection
1. Spoken by the director to start or resume a bout. Full commencing phrase is En Garde. Fertig? Los!
2. 'Let's go, come on'
Schielhau
noun
Zornhau
noun
1. A powerful, diagonally descending blow. Technique used in German Longsword (Kunst Des Fechtens).
2. 'Wrathful hew'

== See also ==
- Outline of fencing
