= Épée =

Weapon and type of modern fencing

Shown is an épée fencer, with the valid target area (the entire body) in red.

The épée (/ˈɛpeɪ, ˈeɪ-/, French: [epe]; lit. 'sword'), also rendered as epee in English, is the largest and heaviest of the three weapons used in the sport of fencing. The modern épée derives from the 19th-century épée de combat, a weapon which itself derives from the Rapier side arm.

As a thrusting weapon, the épée is similar to a foil (contrasted with a sabre, which is designed for slashing). It has a stiffer blade than a foil. It is triangular in cross-section with a V-shaped groove called a fuller. The épée also has a larger bell guard designed to protect the user’s arm. In addition to the larger "bell" guard and blade, the épée weighs more than the foil and sabre which contributes to its reputation of being the slowest form of fencing. The techniques of use differ, as there are no rules regarding priority and a lack of right of way. Thus, immediate counterattacks are a common feature of épée fencing. The entire body is a valid target area.

== Overview ==
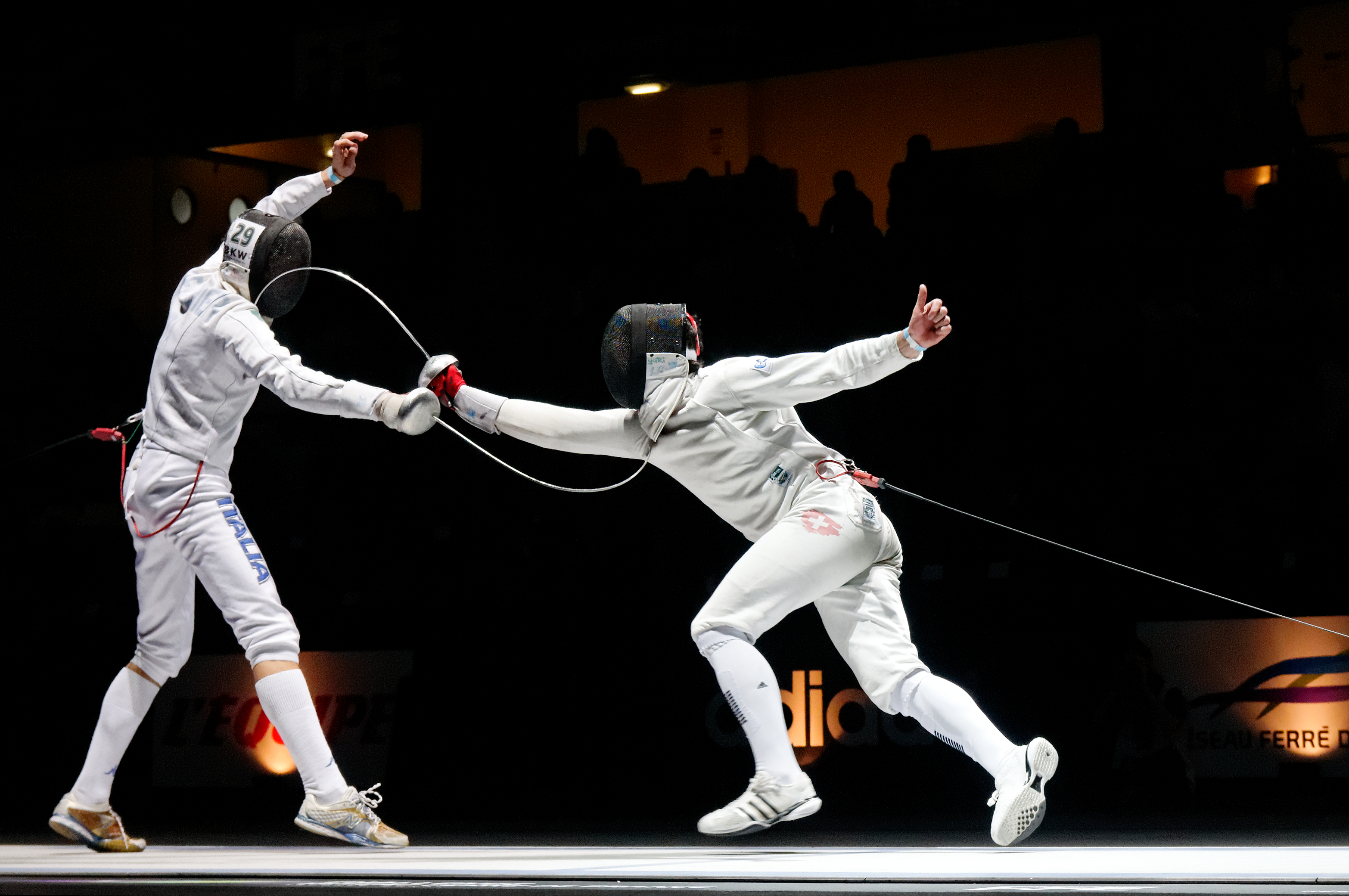
Electric épée fencing: Diego Confalonieri (left) and Fabian Kauter in the final of the Trophée Monal

While the modern sport of fencing has three weapons — foil, épée, and sabre, each a separate event — the épée is the only one in which the entire body is the valid target area (the others are restricted to varying areas above the waist). The épée is the heaviest of the three modern fencing weapons. As with all fencing disciplines, épée require concentration, accuracy, and speed. Since the entire body is a target, a successful épée fencer must be able to anticipate the opponent's moves and strike the opponent at the correct time.

In the highest-level competitions, an electrically grounded (earthed) piste is used to prevent floor hits from registering as touches. In épée fencing, unlike in the other two disciplines, there are no right-of-way rules regarding attacks, other than the aforementioned rule regarding touches with only the point of the weapon. Touches are awarded solely on the basis of which fencer makes a touch first, according to the electronic scoring machines. Also, double-touches are allowed in épée, although the touches must occur within 40 milliseconds (1/25 of a second) of each other.

A special aspect of the épée discipline is an increased emphasis on the counterattack, a tactic employed in response to an attack. Some specifications include two varieties, the stop-thrust and the time thrust, which are (respectively) a simple counterattack and a counterattack on the opposition. With the absence of right-of-way, following an attack and landing a counterattack correctly can be a highly efficient way to score a touch, hence the counterattack's ubiquity in épée fencing. Due to this rule, (and the entire body being a target), épée is considered the slowest of the 3 fencing disciplines.

== Description ==
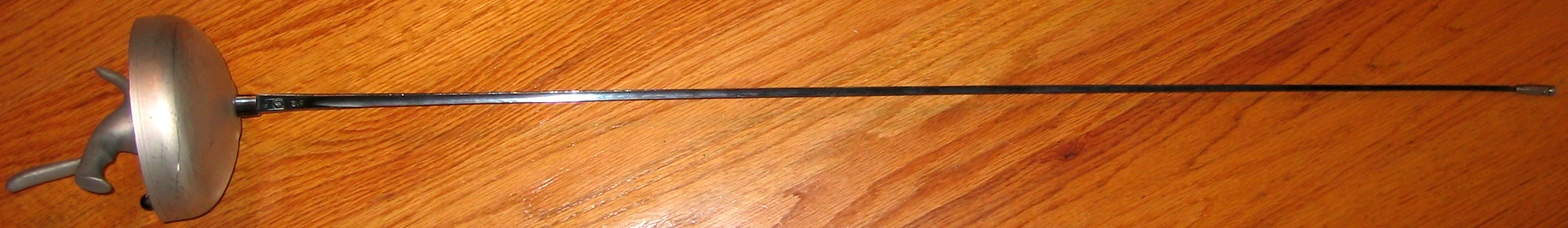
An electric épée with a pistol grip

A modern épée, of size 5, for use by adult fencers has a blade that measures 90 cm (35 in) from the guard to the tip. The total weight of the weapon ready for use is less than 770 g (27 oz), with most competition weapons being much lighter, weighing 300–450 g (11–16 oz). Épées for use by smaller children are shorter and lighter (e.g. size 0), making it easier for them to use.

The blade of an épée is triangular in section, whereas that of a foil is rectangular, and neither blade has a cutting edge. Wires may run down a groove in épée blades fitted for electric scoring, with a depressible button capping the point. In competitive fencing, the width of any of the three sides of an épée's blade is limited to 24 mm (0.94 in).

The guard has numerous forms, but all are essentially a hemispherical shield, the section of which fits in a 10–13.5 cm (3.9–5.3 in) cylinder. This is frequently called a bell guard. As the hand is a valid target in competitive fencing, the guard is much larger and more protective than that of a foil, having a depth of 3–5.5 cm (1.2–2.2 in) and a diameter more likely to be toward the maximum of 13.5 cm (5.3 in).

As with a foil, the grip of an épée can be exchanged for another if it has a screw-on pommel. Grip options primarily include the French grip and the pistol grip.

In competitions, a valid touch is scored if a fencer's weapon touches the opponent with enough force to depress the tip; by rule, this is a minimum of 750 g_{f} (7.4 N). The tip is wired to a connector in the guard, then to an electronic scoring device or "box". The guard, blade, and handle of the épée are all grounded to the scoring box to prevent hits to the weapon from registering as touches.

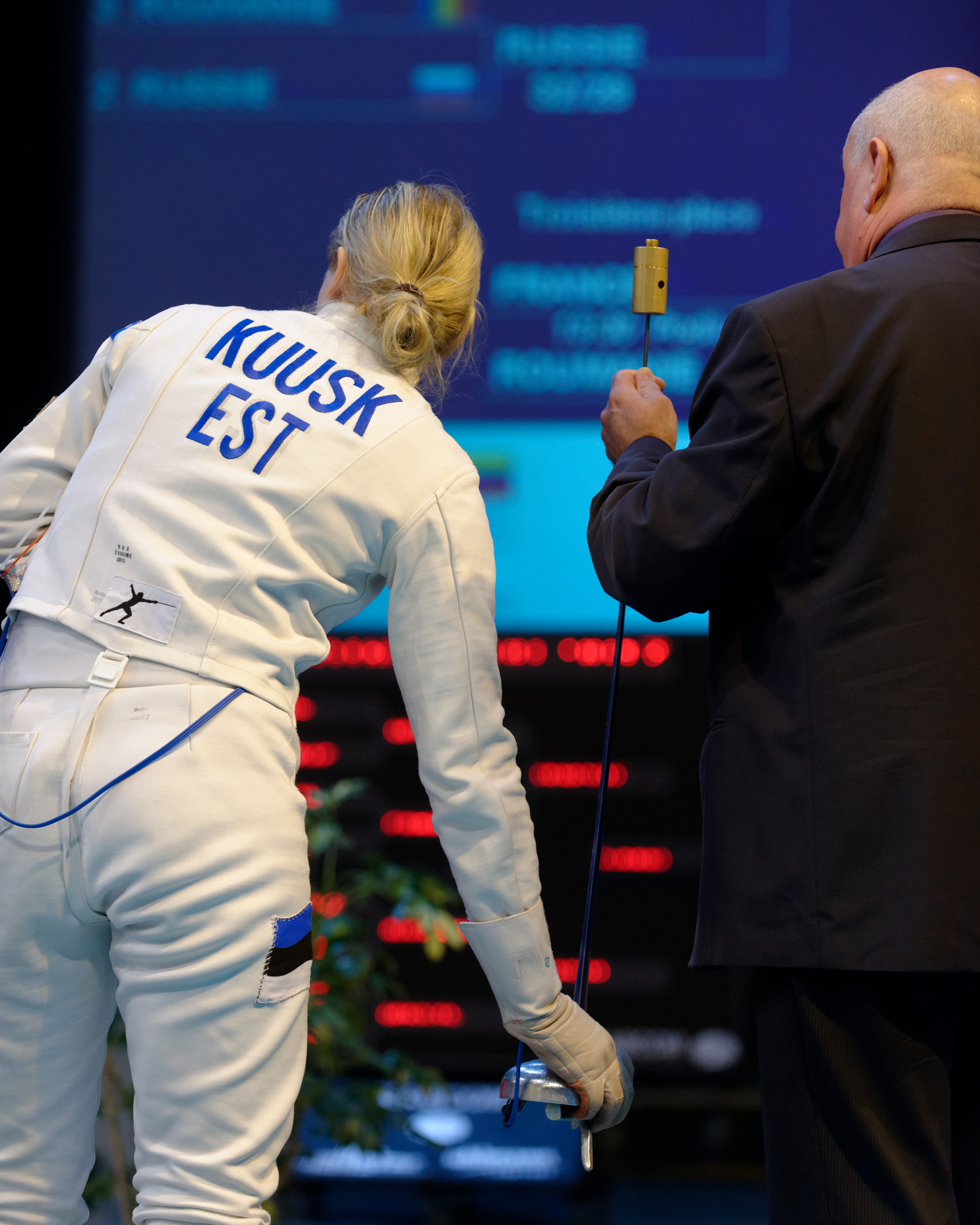
The referee checks Kristina Kuusk's weapon in the Challenge International de Saint-Maur.

In the groove formed by the V-shaped blade, there are two thin wires leading from the far end of the blade to a connector in the guard. These wires are held in place with a strong glue. The amount of glue is kept to a minimum as in the unlikely (but possible) case that a fencer manages a touch in that glue, the touch would be registered on the electrical equipment, as the glue is not conductive (the blade is grounded). In the event of tip to tip hits, a point should not be awarded. A "body cord" with a three-pronged plug at each end is placed underneath the fencer's clothing and attached to the connector in the guard, then to a wire leading to the scoring box. The scoring box signals with lights (one for each fencer) and a tone each time the tip is depressed.

The tip of an electric épée, called the "button", comprises several parts: the mushroom-shaped, movable pointe d'arrêt ('point of arrest') at the end; its housing or "barrel" which is threaded onto the blade; a contact spring; and a return spring. The tips are generally held in place by two small grub screws, which thread into the sides of the tip through elongated openings on either side of the barrel. The screws hold the tip within the barrel but are allowed to travel freely in the openings. While this is the most common system, screwless variations do exist. The return spring must allow the tip to support a force of 750 g_{f} (7.4 N) without registering a touch. Finally, an épée tip must allow a shim of 1.5 mm (0.059 in) to be inserted between the pointe d'arrêt and the barrel, and when a 0.5 mm (0.020 in) shim is inserted and the tip depressed, it should not register a touch. The contact spring is threaded in or out of the tip to adjust for this distance. These specifications are tested at the start of each bout during competitions. During competitions, fencers are required to have a minimum of two weapons and two body wires in case of failure or breakage.

Bouts with the different fencing weapons have a different tempo; as with foil fencing, the tempo for an épée bout is rather slow with sudden bursts of speed, but these are more common in épée due to counterattacks.

== Dueling ==
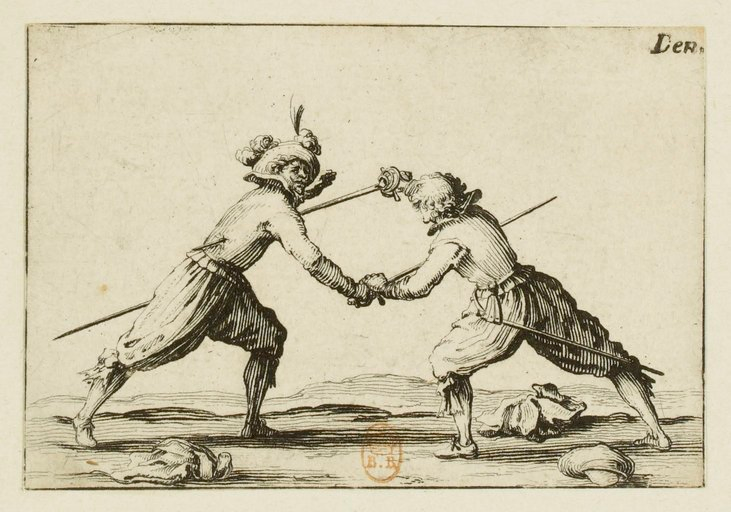
Le duel à l'épée, etching by Jacques Callot (1617)

The French word épée ultimately derives from Latin spatha, a type of straight and long sword. The term was introduced into English in the 1880s for the sportive fencing weapon.

The dueling sword developed in the 19th century when, under pressure from the authorities, duels were more frequently fought until "first blood" only, instead of to the death. Under this provision, it became sufficient to inflict a minor nick on the wrist or other exposed area on the opponent in order to win the duel. This resulted in emphasis on light touches to the arm and hand, while downplaying hits to the torso (chest, back, groin). Rapiers with full-cup guards had been made since the mid 17th century, but were not widespread before the 19th century.

== Sport ==
Today, épée fencing somewhat resembles 19th-century dueling. An épée fencer must hit the target with the tip of the weapon. A difference between épée versus both foil and sabre is that corps-à-corps (body-to-body) contact between fencers is not necessarily an offense in épée, unless it is done with "brutality or violence".

In the pre-electric era, épée fencers used a different kind of point d'arrêt, a three-pronged point with small protruding spikes, which would snag on the opponent's clothing or mask, helping the referee to see the hits. The spikes caused épée fencing to be a notoriously painful affair, and épée fencers could be easily recognized by the tears in their jacket sleeves. A later evolution of the sport used a point that was dipped in a dye, which showed the location of touches on a white uniform; the dye was soluble in weak acid (e.g., acetic acid) to remove old marks. Today, competition is done with electric weapons, where a circuit is closed when the touch is made. Non-electric weapons are now typically used only for practice, generally fitted with plastic buttons or solid "dummy points".

== See also ==
- Colichemarde
