= Grip (sport fencing) =

Part of sporting foil or épée

In fencing, the grip is the part of the weapon which is gripped by the fencer's hand.

There are two types of grips commonly used today in competitive foil and épée: French, which is a straight grip with a pommel at the end of it, and the orthopedic or pistol grip. Virtually all high level foil fencers use a pistol grip; in épée, both types are used. Both kinds of grip optimize hitting with the point of the sword (a 'thrust'), which is the only way to score a touch with a foil or épée.

There are a number of grips which are no longer common or are currently illegal in competitive fencing. The Italian grip is legal but is not used commonly. A number of grips which combine a French grip pommel with pistol grip style prongs are illegal for competition. The rationale for these grips being illegal is that they would allow both the extended reach of the French and the added strength of the pistol grip.

Sabre, which is the only fencing weapon that allows "cutting" with the edge of the blade, has only one kind of grip, because of the way the blade is handled. Sabre grips are generally made of plastic, rubber over metal or plastic, wood, or leather wrapped over wood.

== French grip ==
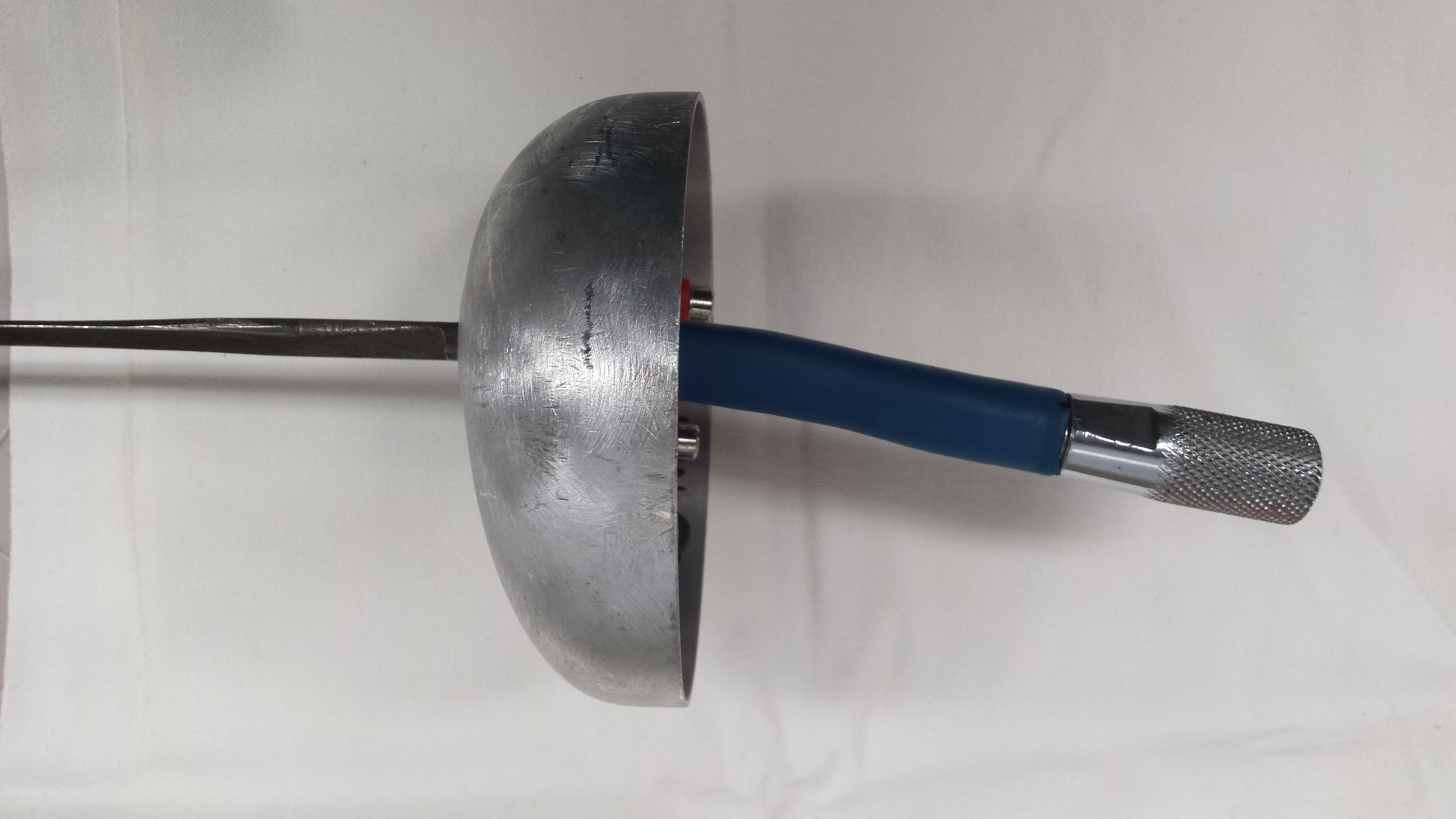
Straight French grip

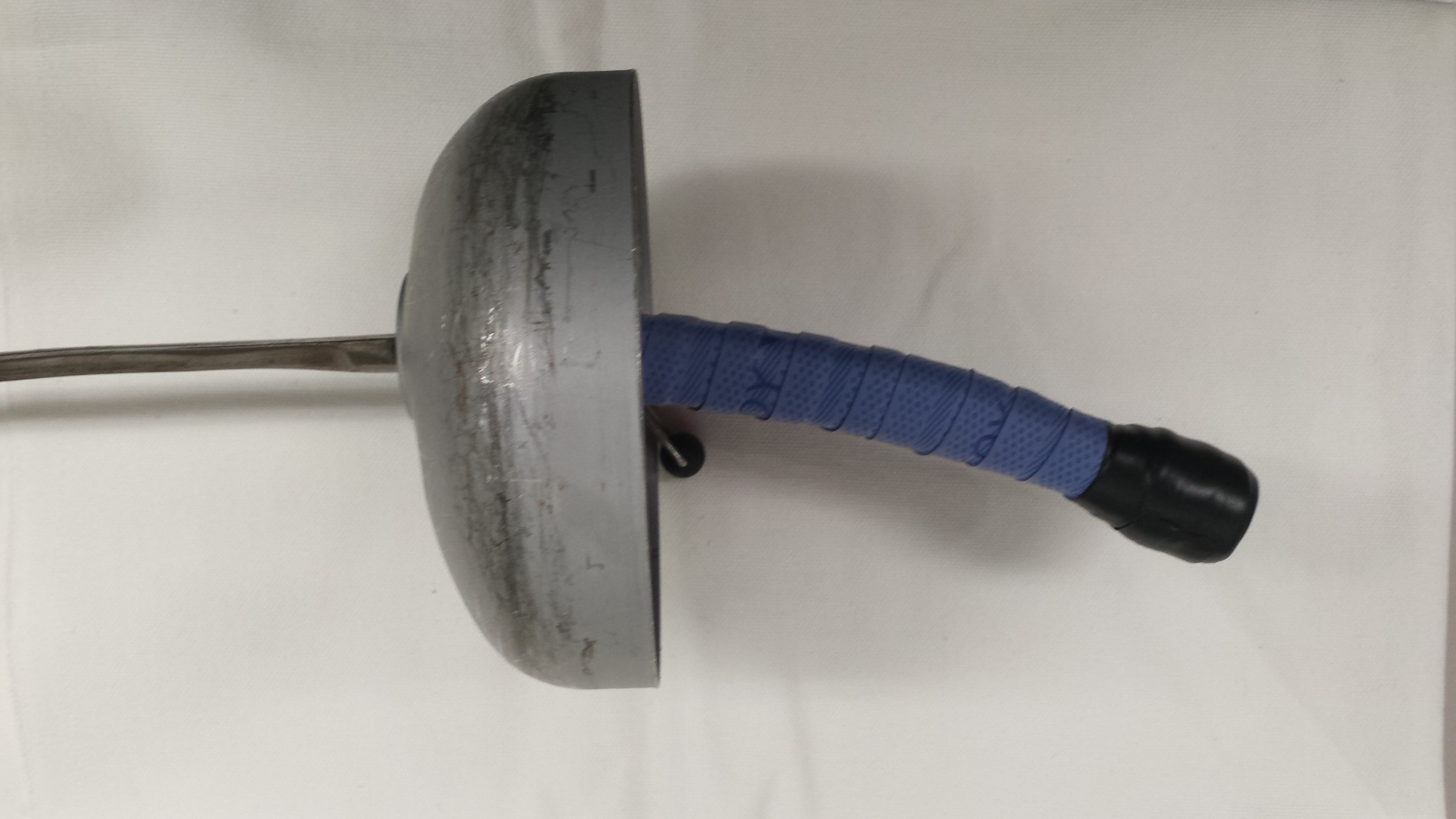
Bent French grip

The French grip is straight or slightly contoured to the curve of the hand. It reached its modern form in the late nineteenth century. The French grip allows the fencer to "post", holding the grip towards the pommel, instead of holding the weapon near the bell guard. This gives the fencer a longer reach while reducing the power of beats and parries, and allows for an expanded repertoire of counterattacks and remises of attacks.

A French grip may be bent or canted somewhat where the blade meets the grip, and it may be bent somewhat along its length. The grip may not be bent or canted so far as to take the pommel outside the cylinder formed by the bell guard.

A substantial number of épéeists at all levels use French grips while posting to allow for longer reach. Posting is not a technique seen in competitive foil, as it decreases one's ability to parry successfully, and thus increases an opponent's chance of a successful hit or remise. As a result, the use of the French grip in competitive foil is extremely rare.

== Pistol grip ==
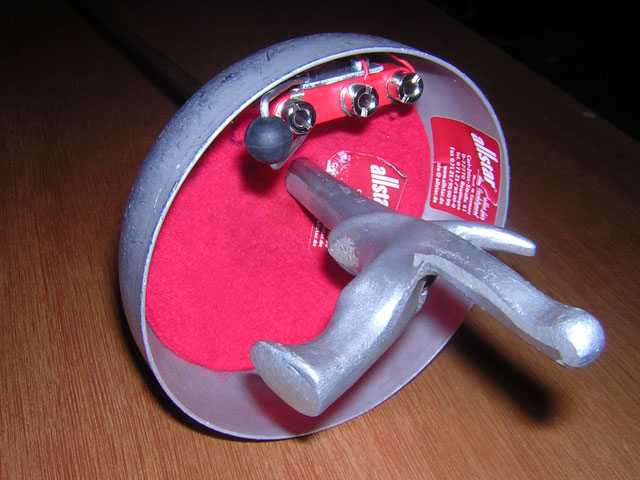
Pistol-grip on an electric épée.

A pistol grip is any grip with a special shape or protrusion intended to aid in holding the weapon. To be legal a pistol grip must fix the hand in one position, and the fencer's thumb must fall within 2 cm of the bell guard when the weapon is gripped.

In competitive fencing pistol grips are nearly universally preferred in foil, and are used by a large percentage of épée fencers because they allow stronger blade movements. These grips provide better control and leverage, which enables fencers to execute precise and powerful actions with their weapons. The ergonomic design of pistol grips reduces hand fatigue, allowing fencers to maintain a firm and stable hold during prolonged bouts, which is crucial for high-level performance in fencing sports.

=== Types of pistol grips ===
While individual manufacturers have variations in shape, pistol grips can be classed into a few broad types:

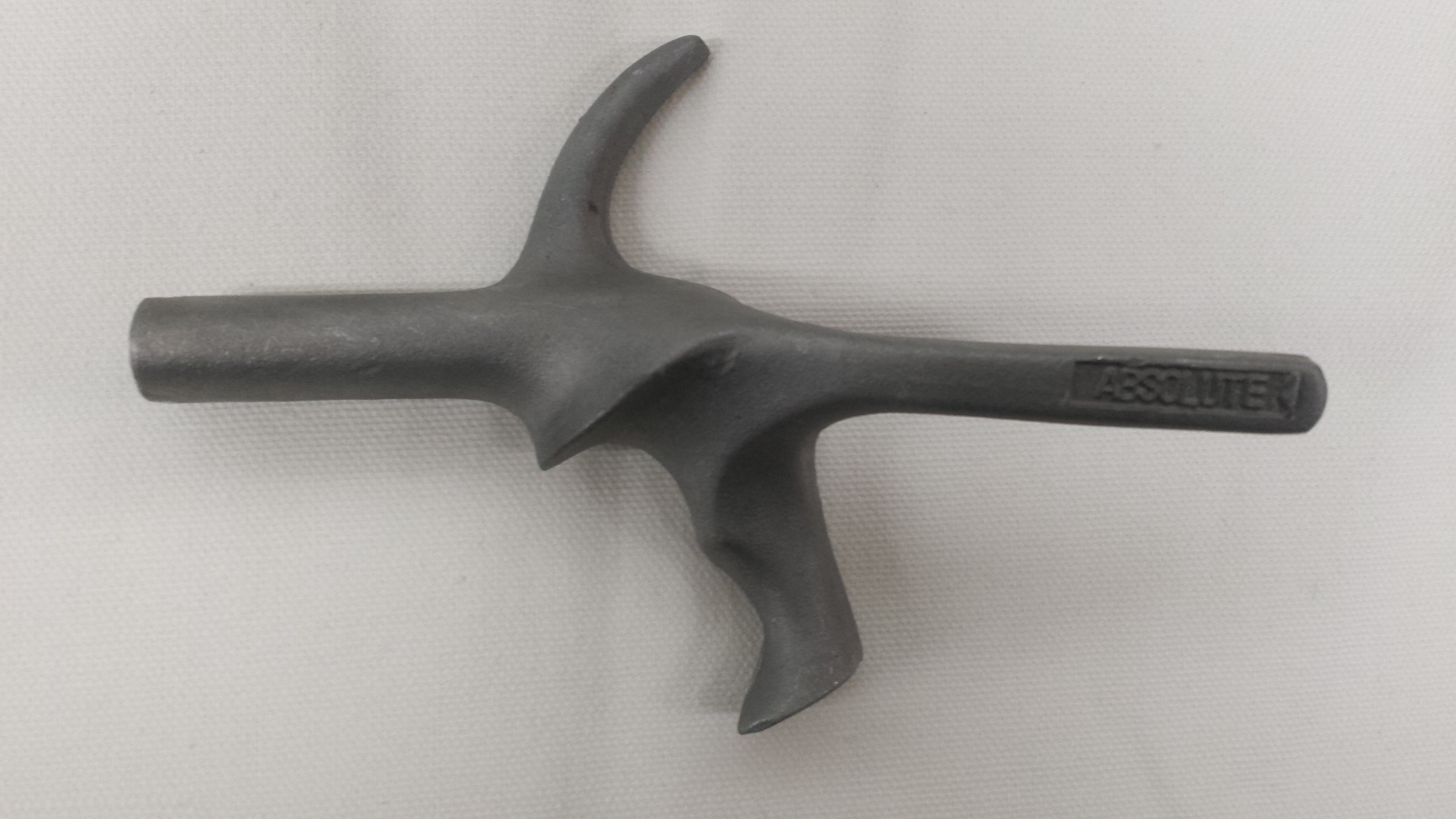
Visconti grip

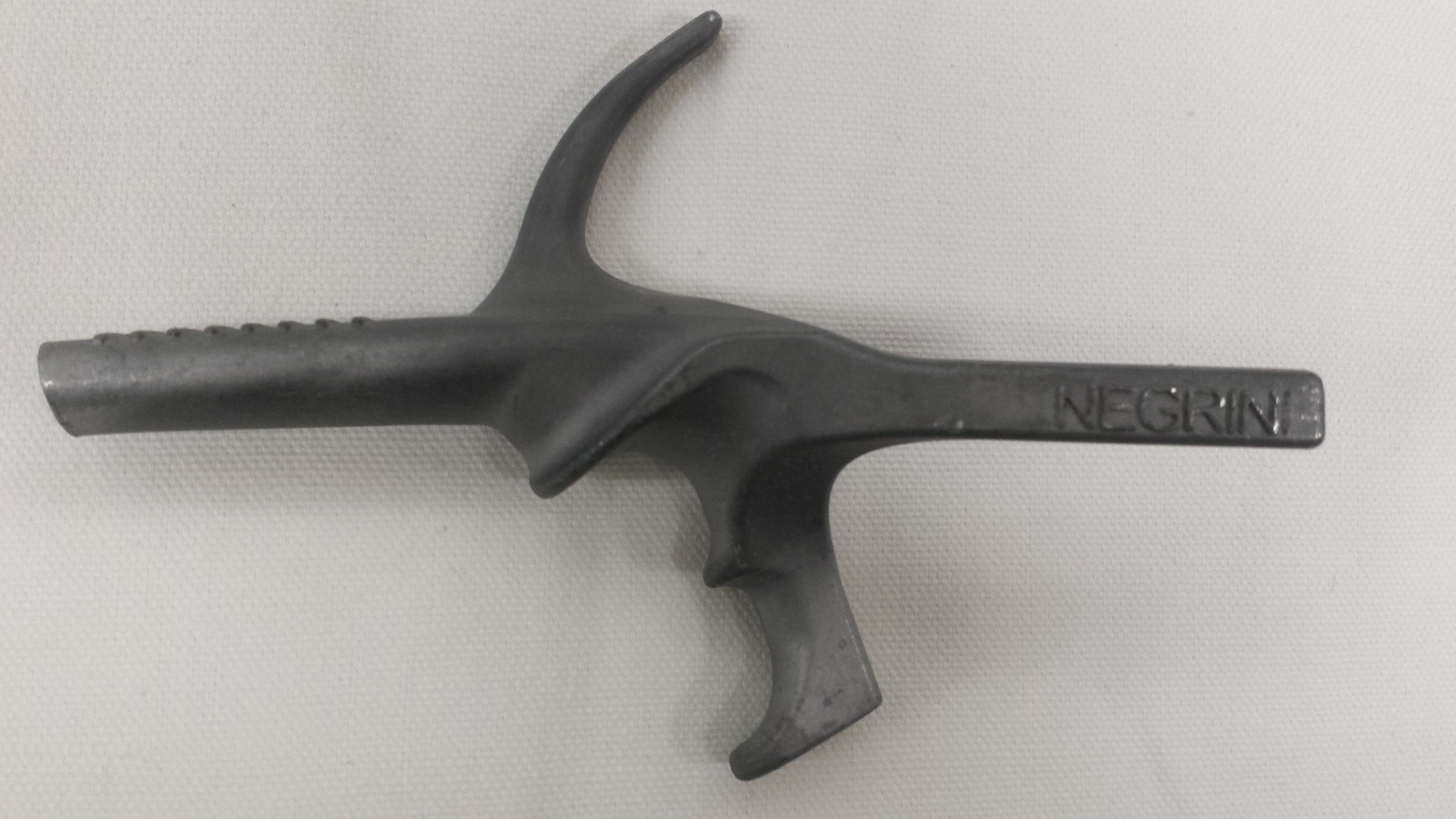
Negrini Visconti grip

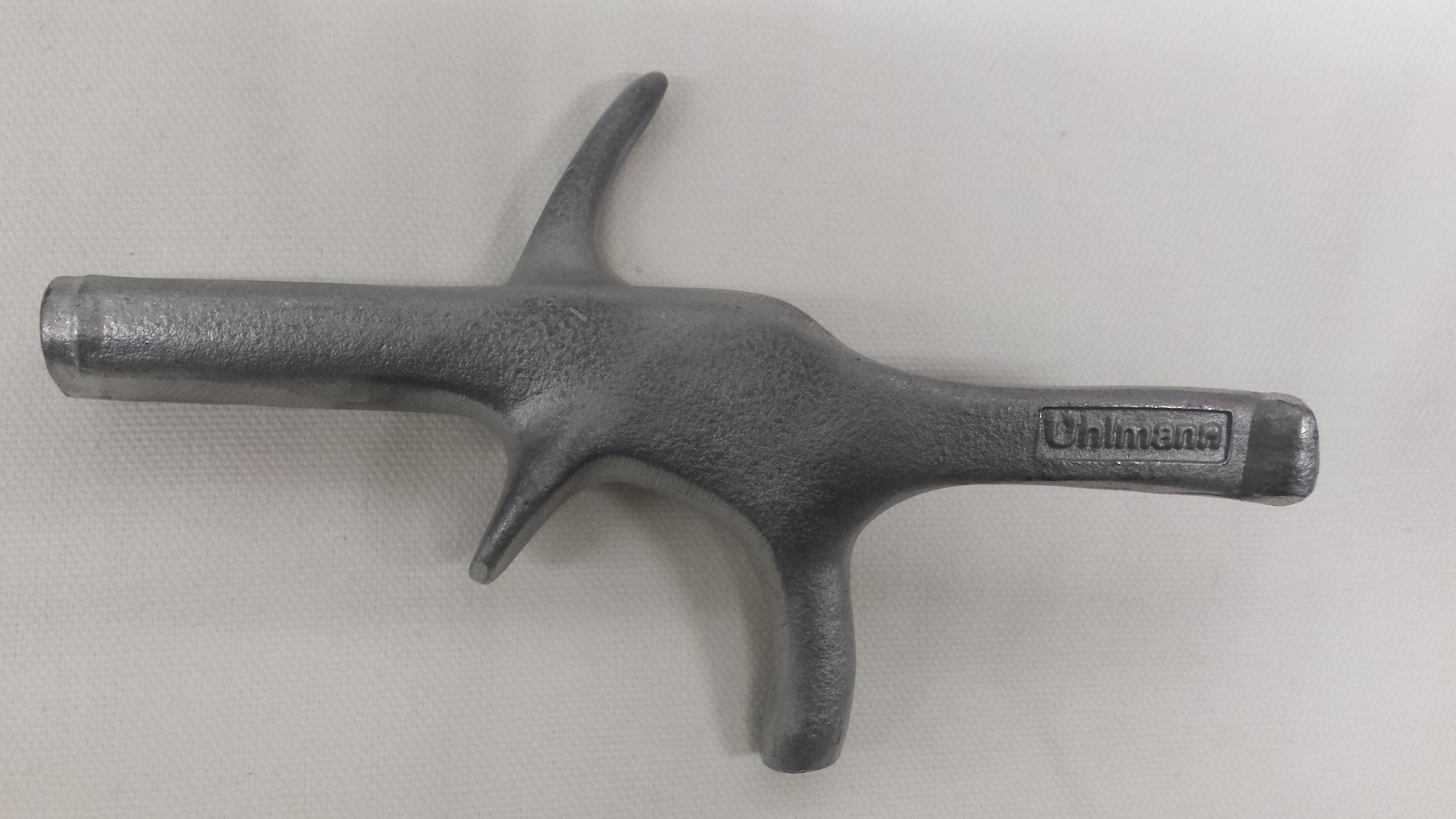
Belgian grip

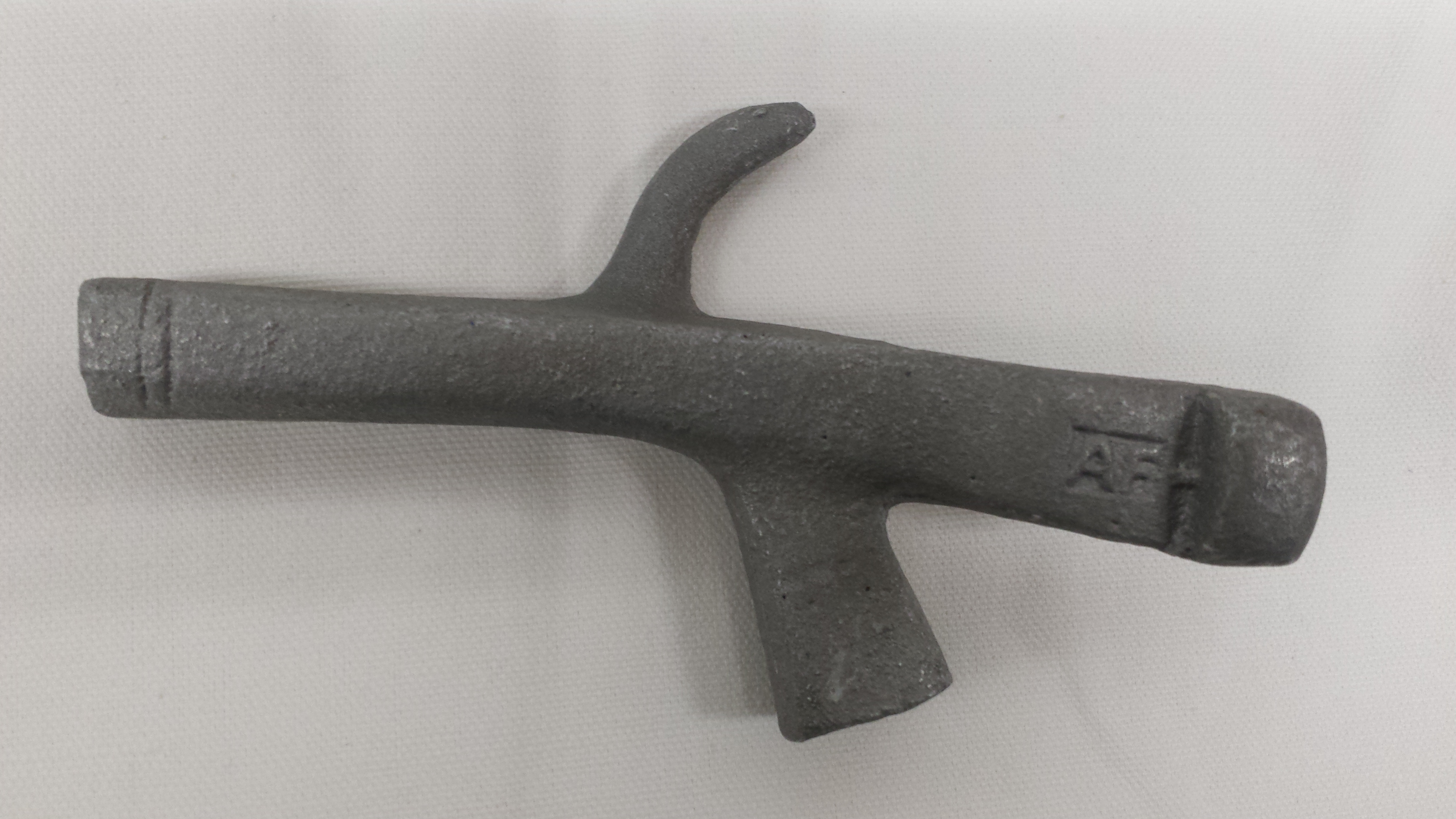
Russian grip

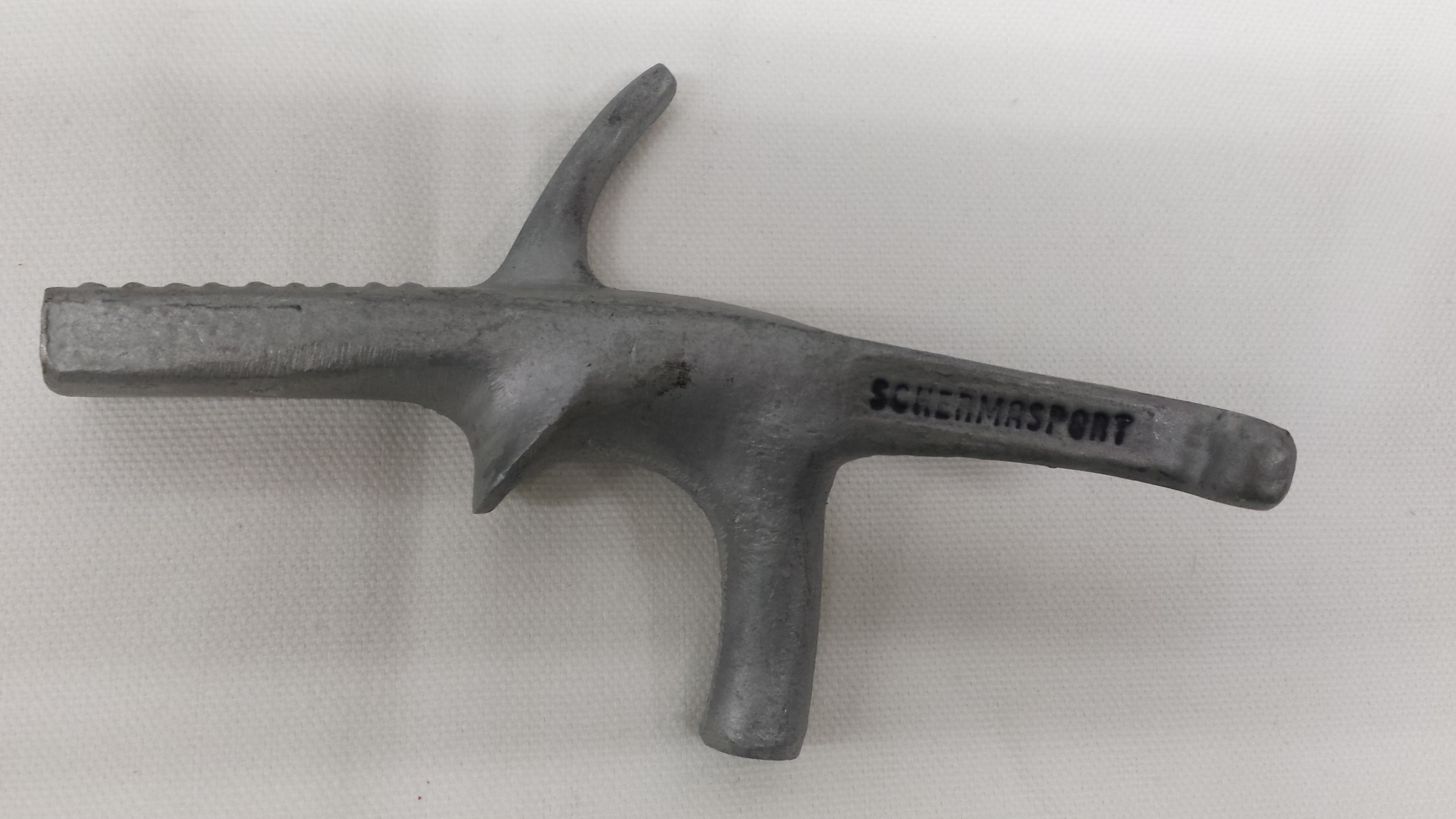
Schermasport grip (a loose variant of a Belgian)

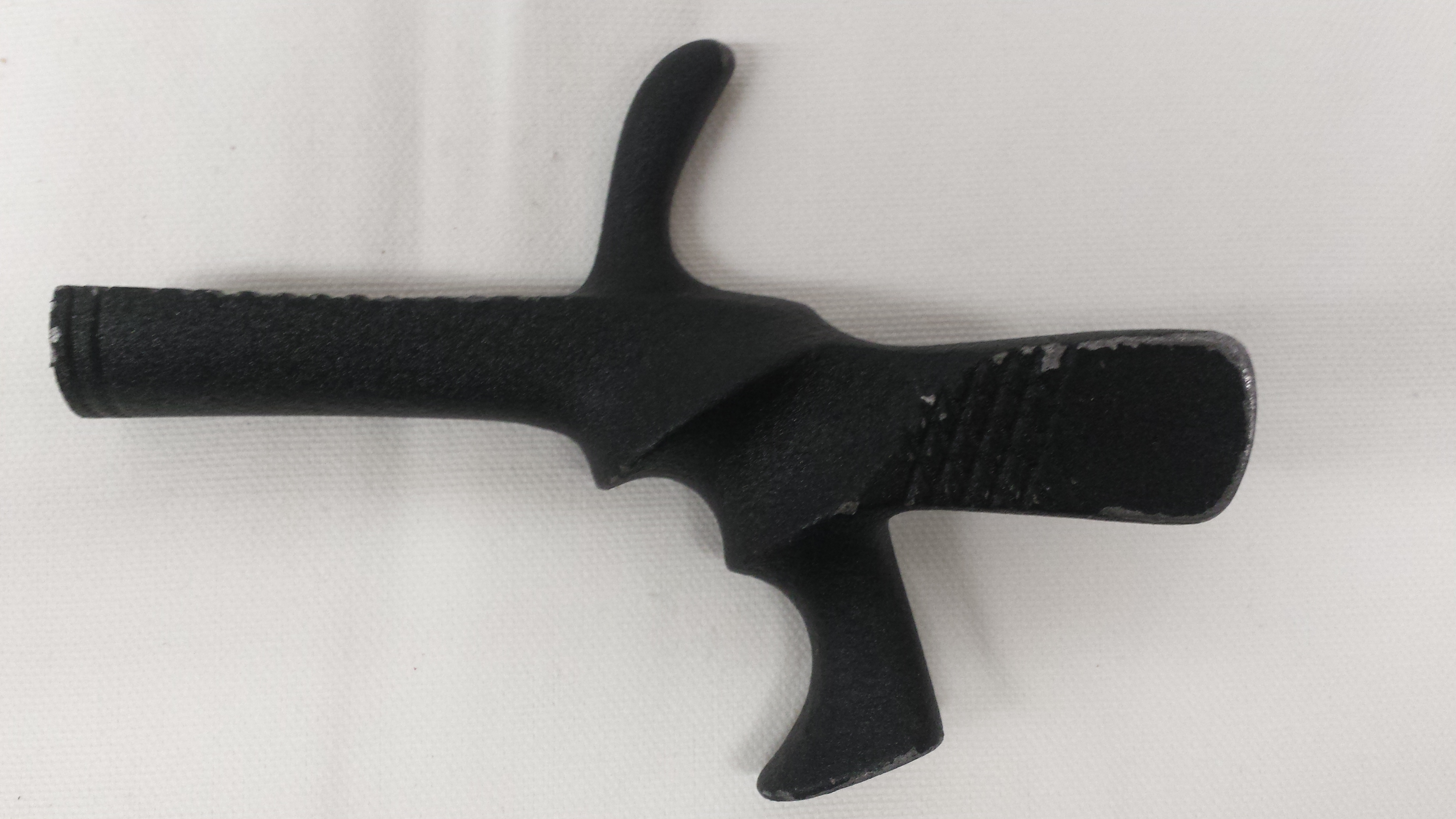
Hungarian grip

== Illegal or little-used variations ==
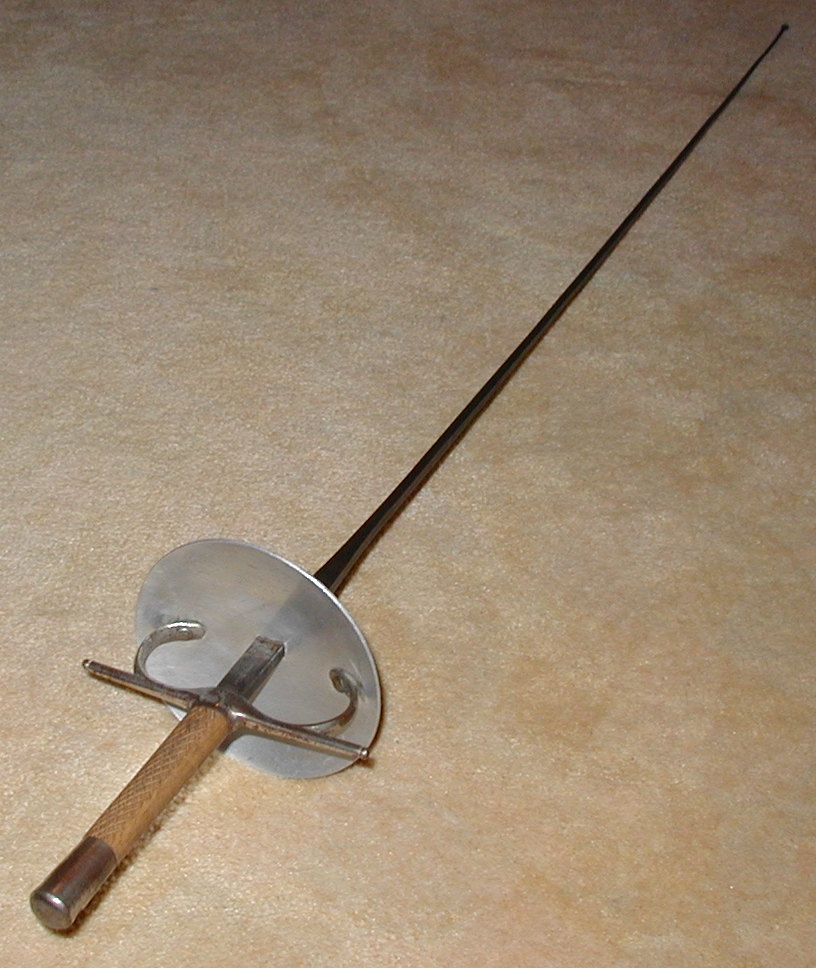
Italian grip

A number of grip variations are either no longer used or are no longer legal to use in competitive fencing.

The Italian grip is legal but is not commonly used in modern fencing. Some view it as a transitional step on the path to the pistol grip, but in fact it is derived from the rapier grip and basically unchanged since the 18th century, predating the modern sport of fencing.

The names of illegal grips are applied inconsistently and have some overlap with uncommon but legal grips. Rules organizations usually do not list names of grips as legal or not, but rather list general characteristics. In general, aside from the Italian grip, if a grip has both prongs to assist the fencer's grip and also a French grip pommel it is not legal to use for competitive fencing.
