= Foil (fencing) =

Weapon and type of modern fencing

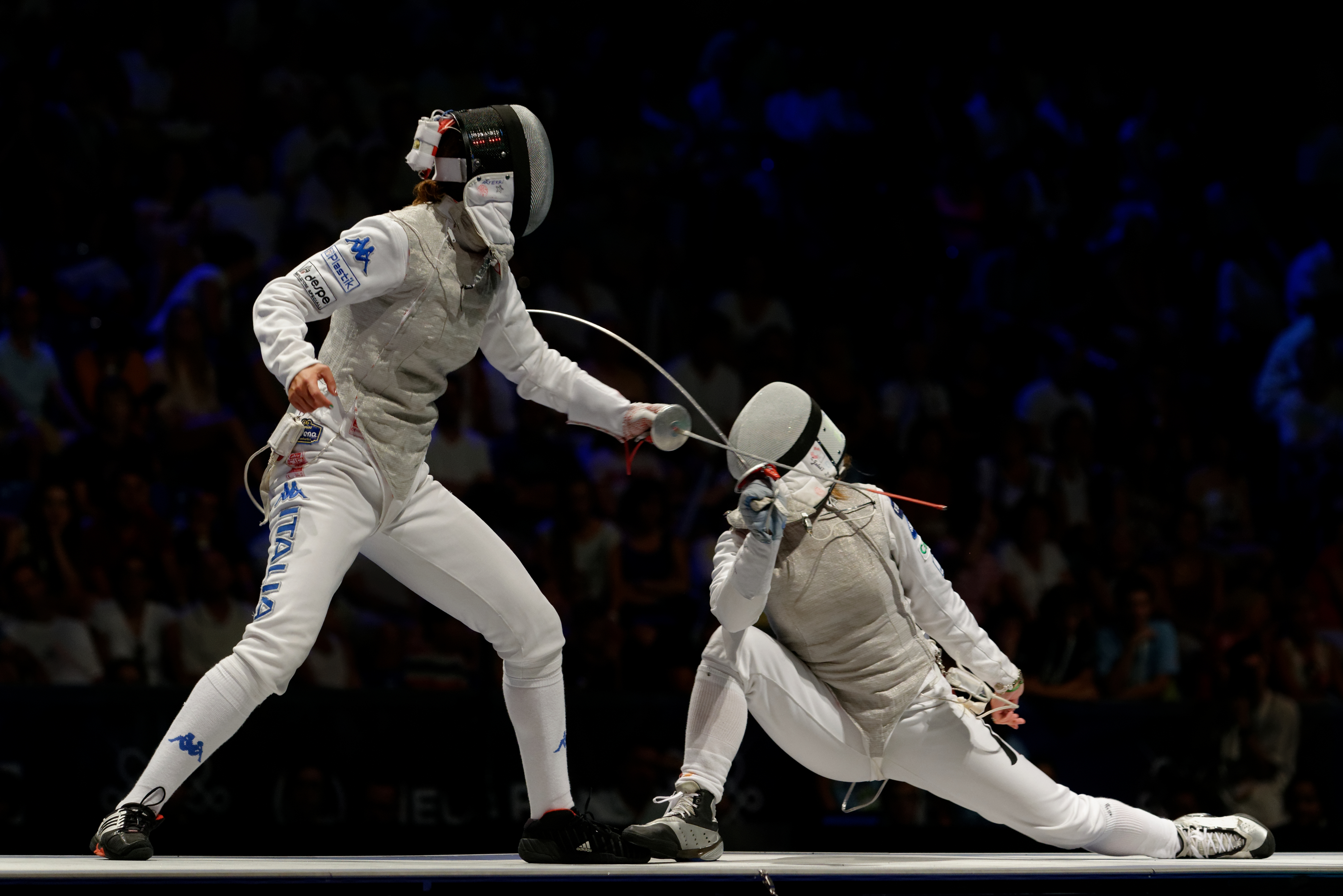
Arianna Errigo (L) competes against Carolin Golubytskyi (R) in the final of the women's foil event, 2013 World Fencing Championships

A foil is one of the three weapons used in the sport of fencing. It is a flexible weapon of total length 110 cm (43 in) or under, rectangular in cross section, weighing under 500 g (18 oz), with a blunt tip. As with the épée, points are only scored by making contact with the tip. The foil is the most commonly used weapon in fencing.

== Non-electric and electric foils ==
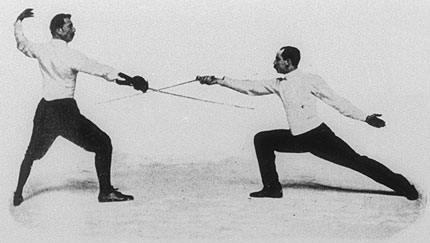
Italo Santelli (left) and Jean-Baptiste Mimiague exhibiting techniques of foil fencing at the 1900 Olympics

=== Background ===
There are two types of foil used in modern fencing. Both types are made with the same basic parts: the pommel, grip, guard, and blade. The difference between them is one is electric, and the other is known as "steam" or "dry". The blades of both varieties are capped with a plastic or rubber piece, with a button at the tip in electric blades, that provides information when the blade tip touches the opponent. (There are also a range of plastic swords made by varying manufacturers for use by juniors.) Lacking the button and associated electrical mechanism, a judge is required to determine the scoring and the victor in a tournament with non-electric foils.

Non-electric ones are primarily used for practice. The Fédération Internationale d'Escrime and most national organizations require electric scoring apparatus since the 1956 Olympics, although some organizations still fence competitively with non-electric swords.

=== Blade ===
Foils have standardized, tapered, rectangular blades in length and cross-section that are made of tempered and annealed low-carbon steel—or maraging steel as required for international competitions. To prevent the blade from breaking or causing harm to an opponent, the blade is made to bend upon impact with its target. The maximum length of the blade must be 90 cm (35 in). The length of the assembled weapon at maximum is 110 cm (43 in), and the maximum weight must be less than 500 g (18 oz); however, most competition foils are lighter, closer to 350 g (12 oz).

The blade of a foil has two sections: the forte (strong) which is the one third of the blade near the guard, and the foible (weak) which is the two thirds of the blade near the tip. There is a part of the blade contained within the grip called a tang. It extends past the grip enough to be fastened to the pommel and to hold the rest of the foil together. When an Italian grip is used, see below, a ricasso extends from under the guard, inside of the grip's quillons, into the tang.

=== Guard assembly ===
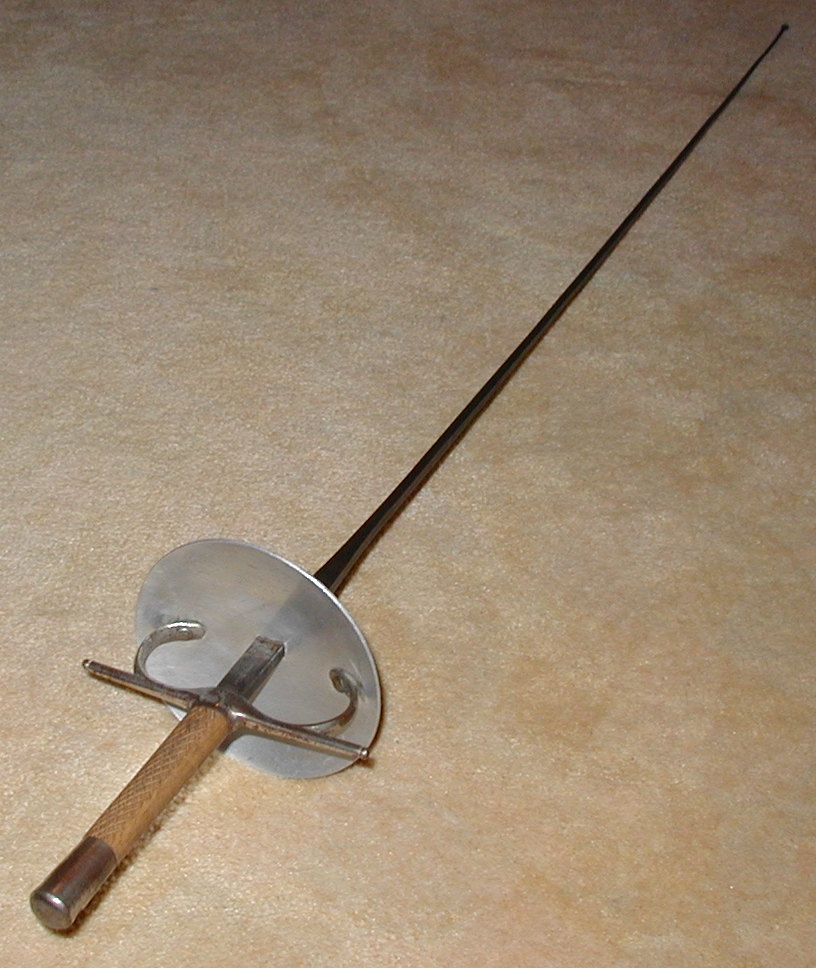
A foil fitted with an Italian grip. While still in use with a small number of classical fencers, all competitive sport fencers have abandoned the Italian grip in favor of variations of the pistol grip, with the French grip used rarely. The last Olympic medal won using an Italian grip was Carlo Montano's silver in 1976. The French grip is easier to learn, but the pistol grip gives a wider range of handling. As of March 2019, the Italian grip remains legal for use in modern competition.

The guard is fastened to the blade, plug, and grip. Then the pommel, a type of fastener, is attached to the grip and holds the rest together. The type of pommel used depends on the type of grip. Two grips are used in foil: straight traditional grips with external pommels (Italian, French, Spanish, and orthopedic varieties); and the newer design of pistol grips, which fix the hand in a specific, ergonomic position, and which have pommels that fit into a countersink in the grip.

=== Electric foils ===
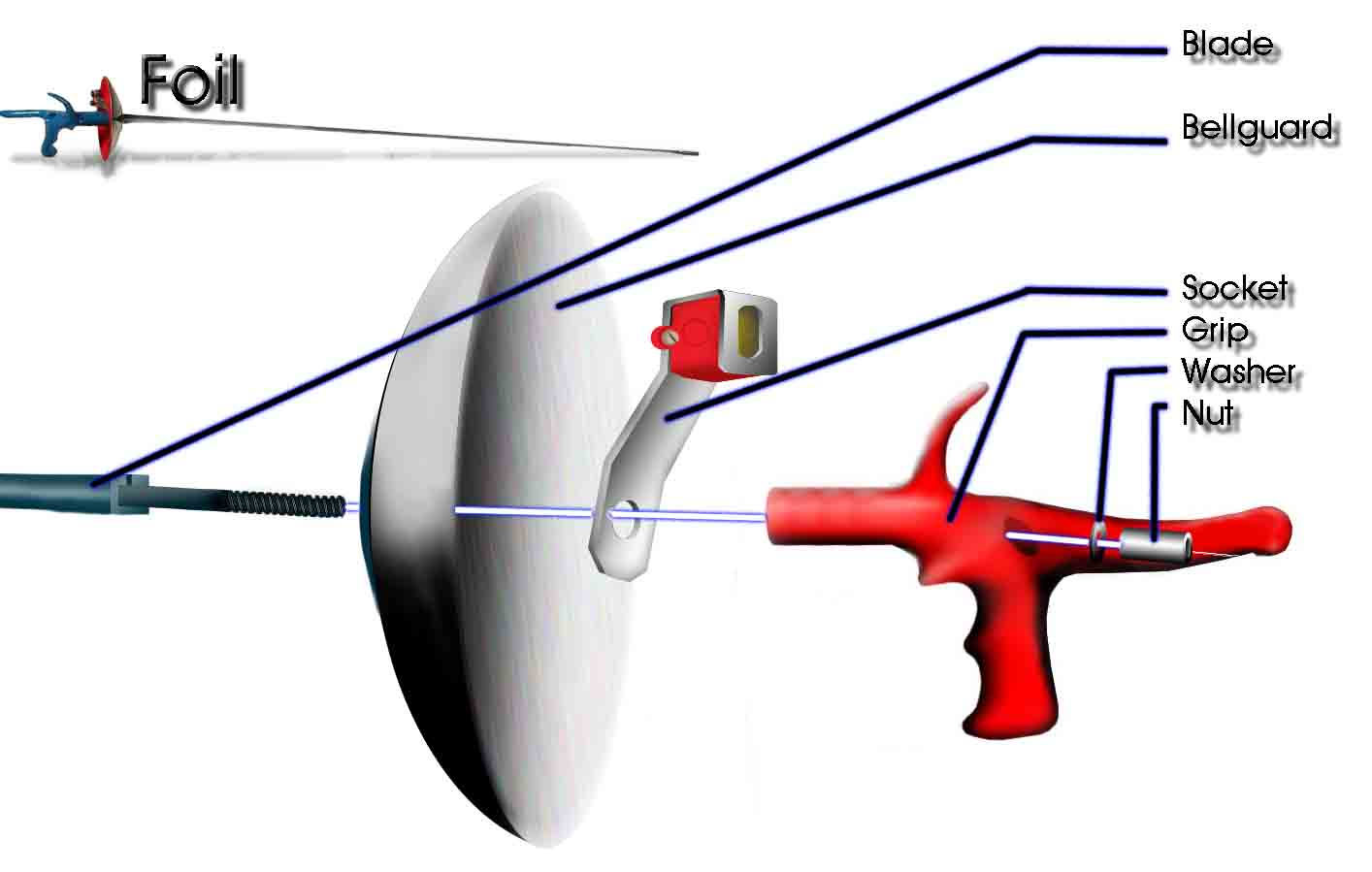
Parts of a foil. Exploded view of a modern fencing foil, with a Visconti grip and a bayonet-style body cord plug

Beginning with the 1956 Olympics, scoring in foil has been accomplished by means of registering the touch with an electric circuit. A switch at the tip of the foil registers the touch, and a metallic foil vest, or lamé, verifies that the touch is on valid target.

==== Cord ====
The cord of any type of electric fencing weapon goes through the fencing gear, coming out behind the fencer. The cord of a foil has one end connecting to the back of the fencing strip, and the other end attaches to the foil. The two ends are not interchangeable with one another.

==== Socket ====
The electric foil contains a socket underneath the guard that connects to the scoring apparatus via the body cord and a wire that runs down a channel cut into the top of the blade. Electric foil sockets are fixed so that the body cord plugs into the weapon at the fencer's wrist. There are two main sockets in use today: the "bayonette" which has a single prong and twists-locks into the foil, and the two prong, which has different diameters for each prong, held in place by a clip.

==== Tip ====
The tip of the electric foil terminates in a button assembly that generally consists of a barrel, plunger, spring, and retaining screws. The circuit is a "normally closed" one, meaning that at rest there is always a complete power circuit; depressing the tip breaks this circuit, and the scoring apparatus illuminates an appropriate light. Color-coding is used: white or yellow indicates hits not on the valid target area, and either red or green indicate hits on the valid target area (red for one fencer, green for the other). When fencing, the FIA (international fencing federation) states that the tip requires a minimum of 500 grams to complete the circuit.

== History ==
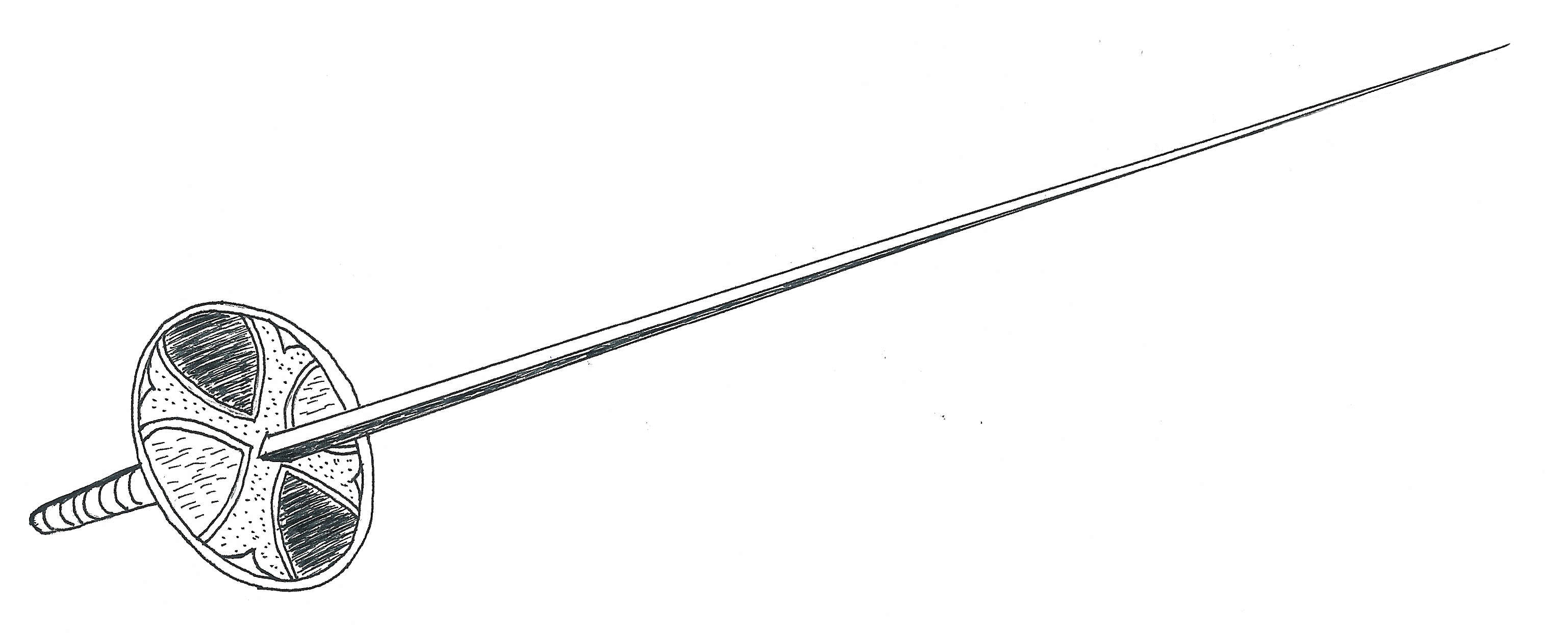
"Pariser" small sword, from which the French foil was derived

The modern foil is the training weapon for the small-sword, the common sidearm of 18th century gentleman. Rapier and even longsword foils are also known to have been used, but their weight and use were very different.

Although the foil as a blunted weapon for sword practice goes back to the 16th century (for example, in Hamlet, Shakespeare writes "let the foils be brought"), the use as a weapon for sport is more recent. The foil was used in France as a training weapon in the middle of the 18th century in order to practice fast and elegant thrust fencing. Fencers blunted the point by wrapping a foil around the blade or fastening a knob on the point ("blossom", French fleuret). In addition to practicing, some fencers took away the protection and used the sharp foil for duels. German students took up that practice in academic fencing and developed the Pariser ("Parisian") thrusting small sword for the Stoßmensur ("thrusting mensur").

The target area for modern foil is said to come from a time when fencing was practiced with limited safety equipment. Another factor in the target area is that foil rules are derived from a period when dueling to the death was the norm. Hence, the favored target area is the torso, where the vital organs are.

In 1896, foil (and sabre) were included as events in the first Olympic Games in Athens.

=== Women's foil ===
Women's foil was first competed at the Olympics in 1924 in Paris, and was the only Olympic fencing event in which women competed until women's épée was introduced at the 1996 Olympics.

In 1940 the Amateur Fencers League of America issued a new rule book stating that women were allowed to compete in foil (in bouts to four points or eight minutes), but touches below the waist (delineated by a dark-colored sash) were off-target. In 1957 they issued a new rule book including alternate rules for 8-point bouts (women's foil) and 10-point bouts (men at all weapons), with a requirement of a two-point advantage (15-minute time limit). In 1965 they issued a new rule book in which the target area for women's foil was made the same as that for men's foil.

=== Ratings ===
Ratings/Rankings are generally run by national fencing federations and use varying scales based on that particular federations system. These ratings are used as the basis for initial seeding into the pool rounds of tournaments and vary country to country.

=== Groups ===
Age groups are necessary to separate skill and body maturity levels in order to create a level playing field. The current age groups for foil (and also épée and sabre) are Y10 (age 10 and under), Y12 (age 12 and under), Y14 (age 14 and under), cadet (age 16 and under), junior (age 19 and under), and senior (ages over 19). While an older competitor cannot compete in a younger category, the contrary is allowed and encouraged, in order to expedite learning.

The veteran age group consists of 40 and over, 60 and over, and 70 and over sub-groups.

== Rules ==
The rules for the sport of fencing are regulated by national sporting associations—in the United States, the United States Fencing Association (USFA) and internationally by the International Fencing Federation (FIE).

The detailed rules for foil are listed in the USFA Rulebook.

Rules for the sport of fencing date back to the 19th century. The current international rules for foil were adopted by the FIE Committee for Foil on 12 June 1914. They are based on previous sets of rules adopted by national associations. The rules governing the use of electrical judging apparatus were adopted in 1957 and have been amended several times.

=== Scoring ===
The foil is used as a thrusting (or point) weapon only. Contact with the side of the blade (a slap or slash) does not result in a score. The tip of the foil must be depressed for at least 15 (± .5) milliseconds while in contact with the opponent's lamé (wire-mesh jacket which covers valid target area) to score a touch. The foil lamé only covers the torso while in sabre it covers the whole upper body. The tip must be able to support a minimum force of 4.90 newtons (500 grams-force) without the circuit breaking. This is tested with a 500g (± 3g) weight.

=== Target area ===
In foil the valid target area includes the torso (including the lower part of the bib of the mask) and the groin. The head (except the lower part of the bib of the mask), arms, and legs are considered off target. Touches made off-target do not count for points, but do stop play. Touches to the guard are the only touches that do not stop play. The target area has been changed multiple times, with the latest change consisting of adding the bottom half of the bib to the target zone.

Target area for foil

=== Priority (right of way) ===
Foil competition and scoring is governed by the rules of priority, also known as right of way. Originally meant to indicate which competitor would have scored the touch (or lethally injured the other), it is now a main contributor to the appeal of the sport of fencing. In essence, it decides who receives the point (there can only be one competitor that receives a point per engagement) when both competitors hit.

The basic rules are whoever the referee judges to be the attacking fencer has "priority". This "priority" can be changed in several ways. The first is the defending fencer deflects the attack from the fencer with "priority" with the forte (strong) of their blade (a "parry"). This switches the "priority" to the fencer who just parried. The second way priority can be switched is if the attacking fencer's attack misses (this is generally judged off the attacking fencer's arm extension. The final major way "priority" can be shifted is if the defending fencer "beats" their opponent's blade (this can also be used by the attacking fencer to make it clear to the referee that they are continuing their attack) this involves striking the foible (weak) of their opponents blade with their own. If both fencers are judged by the referee to be seeking to beat each other's blades then the fencer who is on the attack is favored.

== See also ==
- Sabre (fencing)
- Épée
- Colichemarde
- Rapier
