= Piste (fencing) =

Playing area used in modern fencing

In modern fencing, the piste or strip is the playing area. Regulations require the piste to be 14 metres long and 1.5 metres wide. The last two metres on each end are hash-marked to warn a fencer before they back off the end of the strip, after which is a 1.5- to 2-metre runoff. The piste is also marked at the centre and at the en garde lines, located two metres either side of the center line.

Stepping off the end of the strip with both feet results in a touch being awarded to the opponent. Leaving the side of the strip with one or both feet stops the action and is penalized by allowing the opponent to advance one metre before the bout resumes. If this penalty would place the offending fencer beyond the rear limit of the strip, a touch is awarded instead. A fencer may never be repositioned behind the rear line when play is halted for reasons other than stepping off the side of the piste.

After each touch, fencers return to the en garde lines, positioned 4 metres apart, or approximately at a distance where their extended blades nearly meet. If no touch is scored but the action is halted, they resume from the point where play was stopped.

Most pistes used in competition are grounded to the scoring apparatus, ensuring that any contact with the strip itself does not register as a valid hit. This prevents accidental touches to the piste from being recorded as off-target hits and unnecessarily stopping the bout.

== Typology ==
There are three different types of piste:

- Rubber conductive piste (non-metallic, highly portable): This piste features a conductive surface material with a rubber backing. At approximately 25 kg, it is notably lightweight, enhancing its portability and ease of setup. The rubber backing not only prevents slippage, providing stability, but also contributes a level of cushioning that benefits fencers by reducing impact during movements. This type is ideal for facilities that require quick setup and frequent repositioning, making it the most portable option among the three.
- Aluminium section piste (metallic, less portable): Constructed from sections of rolled aluminum that are bolted together, this piste weighs around 300 kg, making it the heaviest of the three. The robust and durable nature of aluminum makes this piste suitable for permanent or long-term setups in locations where it will not need to be moved frequently. Its sectional design allows for some customization in length and configuration, making it a preferred choice for competitive and professional environments that do not require frequent portability.
- Metallic piste (metallic, moderately portable): Made from woven metal with no backing, this piste weighs approximately 70 kg. The absence of backing increases its flexibility, facilitating easier roll-up and storage. It offers a good balance between durability and portability, suitable for locations that occasionally need to repurpose the space, requiring a durable yet easily movable fencing surface. This piste is ideal for venues that host competitions but also need the flexibility to clear space when necessary.
