= Rocco Bonetti =

Italian Fencer and Intelligence agent

Rocco Bonetti (/rɔk.ko/ /bɔˈnɛtti/; fl. c. 1570–1587) was an Italian intelligence agent and master of fencing who started the school of fencing at Blackfriars in London in 1576. He was known for teaching rapier techniques, particularly as an earlier advocate for thrusting, as opposed to slashing with the weapons.

== Early life ==
Rocco Bonetti was born in Baresi, a small town in the Brembana valley, in Bergamo, Italy.

== Life in England ==
Bonetti first arrived in England around 1569. Some time around 1571, he married Eleanor Burbage (Daughter to James Burbage), and on the 6th of July 1572, Bonetti received a letter of denization granting him many rights, such as the ability to hold land and inherit property, which, as an Italian immigrant, he was unable to do prior.

== School of Fencing ==
Bonetti took over a lease from playwright John Lyly to open his school in the Blackfriars Playhouse after a large property dispute, and this school in Blackfriars was the first school instructing on the correct use of the rapier in England. Bonetti began undertaking improvements on the property, having the promise of the owner, Sir William More, to extend the lease. When Sir William More tried to go back on his promise, Walter Raleigh, and others Bonetti had mentored, helped secure an arrangement that would allow Bonetti to keep the fencing school for at least another ten years. He was known to teach the highest society members, charging as much as fifty times as much for instruction as many of the other Masters of the period could. His students included notable figures such as Lord Peregrin Willoughby, Sir Walter Raleigh and possibly even Vincentio Saviolo and Jerónimo Carranza. The school hall was decked out in finery, the coats of arms of the students being on display, alongside a clock, and a writing desk complete with stationary. Bonetti was fond of his high-status students and found a way of allowing them to display their status whilst contributing to his college's reputation. It was a place where social status was displayed and performed, with his student's ornamented fencing equipment were on display to other men who made the college their hub. Rocco's schoolroom was both a college, and a social forum, with an Italianate style.

Bonetti and fellow students of similar styles, Jerónimo and Saviolo, were disliked by some English fencing masters of the period, such as George Silver, who said the following of Signor Bonetti in his 1599 fencing treatise Paradoxes of Defense:

"He taught the noblemen & gentlemen of the court. He caused some of them to wear leaden soles in their shoes, the better to bring to nimbleness of the feet in their fight. He disbursed a great sum of money for the lease of a fair house in Warwick lane, which he called his college, for he thought it great disgrace for him to keep a fence school, he being then thought to be the only famous master of the art of arms in the whole world."

When some of London's English Masters asked Bonetti to join the Company of the Maisters of Defence in the 1580s, he refused on account of his status as a gentleman.

== Intelligence Agent and Surviving Letters ==
There are some letters that have survived insinuating that Bonetti worked, at a time, as an intelligence agent. Based on the surviving letters, we can assume at least he was involved in some degree to national intelligence. On the 12th of February 1583, King James of Scotland wrote to Queen Elizabeth regarding Bonetti having been in Scotland in the King's service on the recommendation of their mutual cousin, the Duke of Brabant. On the 26th of April 1583, French Ambassador, Michel de Castelnau wrote to Sir Francis Walsingham, attesting that since Bonetti's return from Scotland, he has been threatened by the Earl of Oxford. By the 9th of August that same year, Bonetti had sent a letter to Sir Francis Walsingham offering to accompany him to Scotland.

At an unknown point in 1584, Bonetti sent another letter to Sir Francis Walsingham, explaining how Hugh Hare and William Dool wronged him, and asking for intervention on Walsingham's end; the details of the wrongdoing were enclosed in other, now lost documents, so it is unknown what actually occurred between the men.

== Personal life ==
Bonetti's wife, Eleanor, died in 1574, only 3 years after they wed.

Bonetti was also likely a friend of Former Cambridge MP John North, who referred to him in his diary as "il S[ignor] Rocco Italiano". The two likely first met through fencing, and since then, had been somewhat close. Throughout his writings, both in his diary and in his letters, North refers to Bonetti quite positively, indicating they were at the least well acquainted

Around 1585, at the end of the 10-year lease for the college at Blackfriars. North and other associates, such as Lord Peregrin Willoughby, Walter Raleigh, and Robert Sothebie defended Bonetti against Sir William More about extending the lease for the college at Blackfriars.

Walter Raleigh said of Bonetti in his only surviving letter on this dispute:

"I have a very good opinion of the poor gentleman, whose honest behaviour and singular good qualities deserveth great commendation."

John North, amongst his surviving letters, described Bonetti as "a stranger, whom I doe affect"

== Death ==
Bonetti's disfavour seemed to be his undoing, as he was killed in 1587, after a swordsman named Austin Bagger challenged Bonetti to a duel outside of his college. After wounding Bonetti's legs and feet, Bagger then stamped on him, out of contempt for courtly rules which were so in vogue thanks to the Italianate swordsmen of Bonetti's ilk. Bonetti later succumbed to his injury.

== Influence ==
=== In popular culture ===
In the play Romeo and Juliet by William Shakespeare, in Act 2, Scene 4, Mercutio refers to Tybalt as "the very butcher of a silk button." This is a reference to a boast made by Bonetti that he could 'hit any English man with a thrust, just upon any button in his doublet'."

In the book The Princess Bride by William Goldman, when the fencer Inigo Montoya and The Man in Black duel on the Cliffs of Insanity, they both mention several fencing techniques they have studied, including those of Bonetti. Other Fencers referred to in the book include: Thibault, Capo Ferro, Agrippa, Fabris, Sainct, and Mcbone.
