= Camillo Agrippa =

Italian engineer, architect and mathematician (1520–1600)

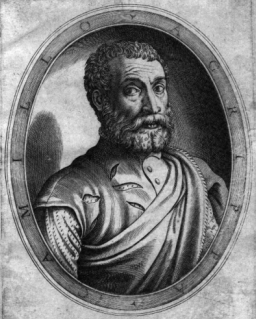
- Camillo Agrippa's portrait, found on his Treatise
- Born: 1520; Milan, Duchy of Milan
- Died: 1 January 1600 (aged 79–80); Rome, Papal States
- Known for: Fencing theorist, architect, engineer, mathematician
- Notable work: Treatise on the Science of Arms with Philosophical Dialogue (1553)

Camillo Agrippa (1520 – 1 January 1600) was a noted fencer, architect, engineer and mathematician of the Renaissance. He is considered to be one of the greatest fencing theorists of all time.

== Biography ==
Though born in Milan, Agrippa lived and worked in Rome, where he was associated with the Confraternity of St. Joseph of the Holy Land and the literary and artistic circle around Cardinal Alessandro Farnese.

He is most renowned for applying geometric theory to solve problems in armed combat. In his Treatise on the Science of Arms with Philosophical Dialogue (published in 1553), he proposed dramatic changes in the way swordsmanship was practised at the time. For instance, he pointed out the effectiveness of holding the sword in front of the body instead of behind it. He also simplified Achille Marozzo's eleven guards down to four: prima, seconda, terza and quarta, which roughly correspond to the hand positions used today in the Italian school. He is also regarded as the man who most contributed to the development of the rapier as a primarily thrusting weapon.

Agrippa was a contemporary of Michelangelo, and the two were probably acquainted (or so Agrippa claims in his later treatise on transporting the obelisk to the Piazza San Pietro). Based on an inscription in a copy of Agrippa quoted in the last edition of the bibliographic dictionary by Jacques Charles Brunet, Manuel du libraire et de l'amateur des livres (1860–1864), some of the copperplate engravings for the book were attributed to Michelangelo, but modern art historians believe the unknown engraver is more likely to have come from the school of Marcantonio Raimondi.

There is evidence indicating that Agrippa's work may have been the inspiration for the Spanish school of swordplay (commonly referred to as Destreza). Don Luis Pacheco de Narváez claims that Don Jerónimo Sánchez de Carranza based his text on the work of Agrippa in a letter to the Duke of Cea in Madrid on 4 May 1618. This seems to be reinforced by a common use of geometry in both systems.

== In popular culture ==
Agrippa is mentioned in the 1987 film The Princess Bride during the swordplay scene above the Cliffs of Insanity when Inigo Montoya (Mandy Patinkin) and Westley (Cary Elwes) (then dressed as the Dread Pirate Roberts) engage each other in swordplay. Early during the interchange, Westley theorizes that his Thibault effectively neutralizes Inigo's Capo Ferro technique, but Inigo counters, "unless the enemy has studied his Agrippa... which I have!"

== Works ==
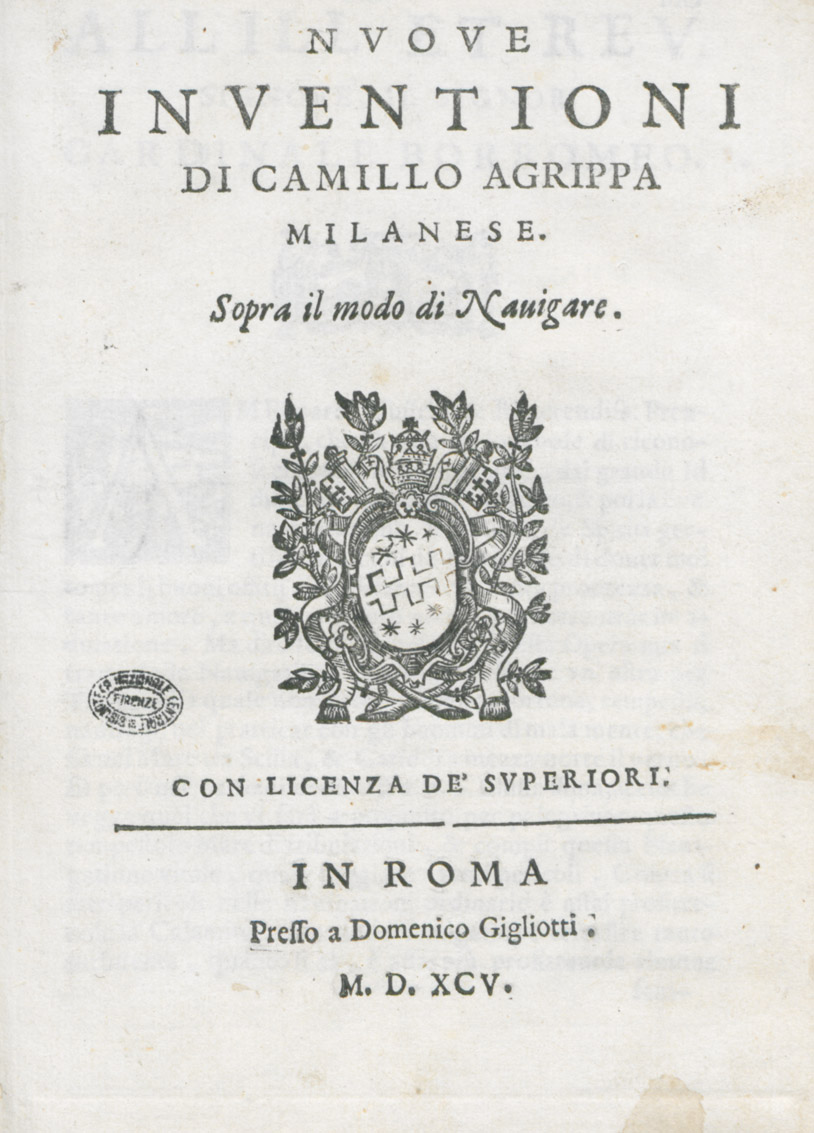
Nuove inventioni sopra il modo di navigare, 1595

- Dialogo sopra la generatione de venti, baleni, tuoni, fulgori, fiumi, laghi, valli et montagne (in Italian). Roma: Bartolomeo Bonfadino. 1584.
- Trattato di transportare la guglia in su la piazza di s. Pietro
- Treatise on the Science of Arms with Philosophical Dialogue, printed by Antonio Blado (1553)
- Dialogo del modo di mettere in battaglia presto et con facilità il popolo di qual si voglia luogo (in Italian). Roma: Bartolomeo Bonfadino. 1585.
- Nuove inventioni sopra il modo di navigare (in Italian). Roma: Domenico Gigliotti. 1595.
