= William M. Gaugler =

American archaeologist and fencer (1931–2011)

William M. Gaugler (5 August 1931 – 10 December 2011) was an American archaeologist specializing in Etruscology, a painter and sculptor, and a prominent fencing master.

== Career ==
Gaugler was inspired to take up fencing by reading as early as 1943 the treatise On Fencing by the great Italian fencer Aldo Nadi. In 1956 he became one of the last students of Nadi in Los Angeles. In 1958 Gaugler went to Europe, working as an artist, and after obtaining his doctorate at the University of Florence he taught history and art and worked with young fencers at the University of Maryland's American School in Frankfurt-am-Main. During his European sojourn, he studied at the French Military Fencing Master's School, with several masters in Italy, and in Germany. Most significant for Gaugler was Maestro Amilcare Angelini in Darmstadt. He earned his fencing master's diploma from the Accademia Nazionale di Scherma in Naples, Italy, in 1976, thus qualifying to teach fencing.

Upon his return to the United States, Gaugler obtained a faculty position in 1969 in the art history and archaeology department at San José State University where he pursued sculpture as well, in 1979 founding under the sponsorship of the university's Army ROTC the Military Fencing Masters Program, of which he was director until his retirement. In 2008 the fencing master's program affiliated with Santa Clara Adult Education and continues to be the only program of its kind in the United States.

Gaugler regularly corresponded with Aldo Nadi until the latter's death in 1965. Gaugler provided an introduction and afterward to Nadi's autobiography The Living Sword when it was published posthumously in 1995.

From the late 1990s until 2006 he wrote a regular series of articles on fencing theory and history for Nick Evangelista's Fencers Quarterly Magazine.

== Works ==
- Fechten für Anfänger und Fortgeschrittene Florett, Säbel, Degen (München, Nymphenburger Verlagsbuchhandlung, 1983) [2nd ed. 1986; 3rd ed. Heyne, 2004]
- Fencing Everyone (Winston-Salem, N.C. : Hunter Textbooks, 1987)
- The Science of Fencing: a Comprehensive Training Manual for Master and Student, Including Lesson Plans for Foil, Sabre and Epée Instruction (Bangor, Maine: Laureate Press, 1997) [2nd ed. 2004]
- The History of Fencing: Foundations of Modern European Swordplay (Bangor, Maine: Laureate Press, 1997)
- A Dictionary of Universally Used Fencing Terminology: with approval of the Joint Board of Accreditation of the United States Fencing Association Coaches College and the San Jose State Univ. Fencing Masters Program (Bangor, Maine: Laureate Press, 1997)
- The Tomb of Lars Porsenna at Clusium and Its Religious and Political Implications (Bangor, Maine: Laureate Press, 2002)

Gaugler also published numerous articles on fencing technique, history, and pedagogy. See bibliography maintained by the Accademia di Scherma Classica.

== Literature ==
William H. Leckie Jr., Fencing as Cartesian Theater: An Hommage to William M. Gaugler (Lulu Press, 2023).
