= Spanish school =

Spanish school may refer to:

- Spanish art, especially Spanish painting
- the Spanish Riding School of Vienna
- Destreza, the Spanish school of swordsmanship
