= Ramon Martinez =

Ramon Martinez may refer to:

== Other people ==
- Ramón Martínez (governor), Venezuelan politician
- Ramón Martínez Vigil (1840–1904), Spanish priest, bishop of Oviedo

== Sportspeople ==
=== Association football ===
- Ramón Martínez (footballer, born 1981), Salvadoran football defender
- Ramón Martínez (footballer, born 1996), Paraguayan football midfielder
- Ramón Martínez (footballer, born 2002), Spanish football defender

=== Baseball ===
- Ramón Martínez (third baseman) (1903–?), Cuban baseball third baseman
- Ramón Martínez (pitcher) (born 1968), Dominican baseball pitcher
- Ramón Martínez (infielder) (born 1972), retired Puerto Rican Major League Baseball utility infielder

=== Fencing ===
- Ramón Martínez (fencer) (born 1926), Spanish Olympic fencer
- Ramon Martinez (fencing instructor), American fencing instructor

== See also ==
- Ray Martinez (disambiguation)
