= The L.A.TEST Stage =

The Latest Stage was a Los Angeles-based theatre company from 1983 to 1988.

The L.A.TEST Stage was a 99-seat, Los Angeles Equity-waiver house, founded by director Benjamin Stuart Thompson and producer Ella Belzberg, with the intention of showcasing the work of a cutting edge group of actors, writers, directors, producers and theatre technicians. Initially, lectures and workshops were held in Theda Bara's home. In 1983, The L.A.TEST Stage started in a converted 5-car garage dubbed the "Cockroach Club" with 60 plush seats donated by UCLA’s Royce Hall. The first production was Sam Shepard’s Angel City starring Ron Cambell. "Angel City" played to full houses until the Los Angeles Fire Marshal ordered the theatre capacity not to exceed seven persons. Since the cast had five, the final performance was for an audience of two: the legendary producer, Ted Schmitt of the CAST Theatres in Hollywood and his assistant. After the performance, Schmitt handed over the keys to the C.A.S.T/Safe Harbor on La Cienega Blvd., which was converted into the L.A.TEST Stage. "The Latest Stage's trademark is productions full of frolicking energy, like their adaptation of Cyrano de Bergerac, which took place in an exciting pirate setting."

== Founding Members ==
- Benjamin Stuart Thompson
- Ella Belzberg
- Ron Campbell
- James Terry
- Steve Matt
- Cameron Thor
- Phil Lubin

== Guest Lecturers ==
- Laurence Olivier
- Joan Plowright
- Anthony De Longis
- Lady Walquer Vareen
- Lendra

== Productions ==
- Angel City by Sam Shepard "...it not only swings, it cooks."
- Cyrano! an original adaptation by Benjamin Stuart Thompson
- Werewolf: An American Fable, a new play by Benjamin Stuart Thompson. "...a Kabuki-styled choreographed movement and overlapping dialogue executed by the five versatile actors and there is enough for eyes and ears to behold in wonder..."
- Pony Express Pageant, a new play by Benjamin Stuart Thompson- Presenting Folklore Through the Arts including: History on Parade on Westwood Boulevard, The Pony Express Touring Wild West Show, performed at State and National Historic Parks, including the show ring at Will Rogers State Historic Park, William O’Douglas Outdoor Classroom in Beverly Hills, Santa Monica Sports and Arts Festival at the Santa Monica Pier, and the Commemoration of the Bicentennial of the U.S. Constitution for the California Governor in Sacramento "It has everything: a hanging, gunplay, a passel of grizzly miners, two fine ladies from the East, "Sweet Betsy From Pike," a louse race, and the dramatic arrival of Pony Bob on horseback with an arrow in his chest. It's only a flesh wound."
