= Little Tin God =

Little Tin God may refer to:

- "Little Tin God", song by Don Henley from The End of the Innocence
- "Little Tin God", an episode of the television show Highlander
