= Destreza =

Spanish tradition of fencing

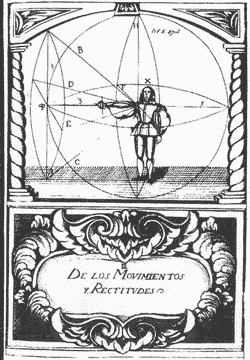
- Focus: Rapier; early modern bladed weaponry
- Country of origin: Habsburg Spain
- Famous practitioners: Jerónimo Sánchez de Carranza, Luis Pacheco de Narváez, Girard Thibault, Anthony De Longis, Ramón Martínez

La Verdadera Destreza is the conventional term for the Spanish tradition of fencing of the early modern period. The word destreza literally translates to 'dexterity' or 'skill, ability', and thus la verdadera destreza to 'the true skill' or 'the true art'.

While destreza is primarily a system of swordsmanship, it is intended to be a universal method of fighting, applicable to all weapons in principle, but in practice dedicated to the rapier specifically, or the rapier combined with a defensive weapon such as a cloak, a buckler or a parrying dagger, besides other weapons such as the late-renaissance two-handed montante; the flail; and polearms such as the pike and halberd.

Its precepts are based on reason, geometry, and tied to intellectual, philosophical, and moral ideals, incorporating various aspects of a well-rounded Renaissance humanist education, with a special focus on the writings of classical authors such as Aristotle, Euclid, and Plato.

The tradition is documented in scores of fencing manuals, but centers on the works of two primary authors, Jerónimo Sánchez de Carranza (Hieronimo de Carança, died c. 1608) and his student Luis Pacheco de Narváez (1570–1640).

== History ==
Jerónimo Carranza's seminal treatise De la Filosofía de las Armas y de su Destreza y la Aggression y Defensa Cristiana was published in 1582 under the sponsorship of Don Alonso de Guzmán El Bueno, 7th Duke of Medina Sidonia, but according to its colophon was compiled as early as 1569.

Carranza's work represents a break from an older tradition of fencing, the so-called esgrima vulgar or esgrima común ('vulgar or common fencing'). That older tradition, with roots in medieval times, was represented by the works of authors such as Jaime Pons (1474), Pedro de la Torre (1474) and Francisco Román (1532). Writers on destreza took great care to distinguish their "true art" from the "vulgar" or "common" fencing. The older school continued to exist alongside la verdadera destreza, but was increasingly influenced by its forms and concepts.

After Carranza laid the groundwork for the school with his seminal work, Pacheco de Narváez continued with a series of other books which expanded upon Carranza's concepts. While Pacheco originally clung closely to Carranza's precepts, he gradually diverged from them in significant respects. This divergence eventually caused a split between followers of Carranza (Carrancistas) and those of Pacheco (Pachequistas), essentially resulting in the existence of three different schools of fence in Iberia.

These new fencing methods quickly spread to the New World. Originally, this was the esgrima común, but eventually included destreza as well. Carranza himself was governor of Honduras for a time. Destreza authors and masters can be documented in Mexico, Peru, Ecuador, and the Philippines. Some degree of influence on the Philippine martial arts is highly likely, although this is an area that requires further research.

El Buscón (1626) by Francisco de Quevedo ridicules a student of Pacheco's Libro de las grandezas de la espada. The chapter ends with a mulatto fencing master who comments that "the book [...] was good but made more fools than skilled [fencers], since most did not understand it". Quevedo also composed injurious poems against Pacheco.

In the 18th century, destreza began a decline in popularity in favour of the dominant French school. This resulted in technical changes which become increasingly apparent by the beginning of the 18th century. By the 19th century, fencing texts in the Iberian Peninsula begin to mix destreza concepts with ideas and technique drawn from French and Italian methodology. While destreza underwent a kind of revival in the late 19th century, it appears to have largely disappeared by the beginning of the 20th century.

Influences from destreza were still found in the 19th century, with the 1849 Manual del Baratero applying them to knife fighting with the navaja or traditional jackknife.

== Technical characteristics ==
Technical hallmarks of the system are the following:

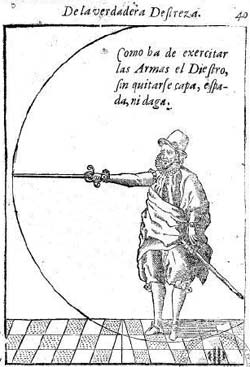

- Visualization of an imaginary circle between the opponents to conceptualize distance and movement
- Use of off-line footwork to obtain a favorable angle of attack
- Avoidance of movement directly toward the opponent
- Extension of the sword arm in a straight line from the shoulder to obtain maximum reach
- Profiling of the body to increase reach and reduce target area
- Use of an initial distance that is as close as possible, while remaining out of reach (medio de proporción)
- A conservative approach, using the atajo (bind) to control the opposing weapon
- Preference for downwards motion (movimiento natural) in all fencing actions
- Use of both cut (tajo, revés) and thrust (estocada)
- Use of a particular type of closing movement (movimiento de conclusión) to disarm the opponent

Perhaps the most important distinction between destreza and other contemporary schools of fencing is its approach to footwork. Over centuries, fencing throughout Europe generally moved towards linear footwork, similar to modern fencing. In contrast, destreza doctrine taught that moving directly toward the opponent was dangerous, and specialized in off-line footwork to either the right or left side to gain a more favorable angle of attack.

Another distinction is their approach to the relative value of cut versus thrust. The general lengthening of rapiers in Europe showed a clear preference for the thrust, relegating the cut to a distant second place. Destreza, on the other hand, refused to make such a distinction, maintaining that the cut could be as useful as the thrust depending on the situation, adapting their weapons accordingly. Although fencers from the Iberian Peninsula developed a reputation for using very long weapons, the weapons used in destreza were generally shorter than the rapiers used elsewhere.

Gradually, bladework in Europe was influenced by the works of Camillo Agrippa and successors, focusing on the use of four primary hand and blade positions (prima, seconda, terza, quarta), with an emphasis on the latter two. Destreza, on the other hand, focused almost exclusively on a hand position similar to terza (thumb at 12 o'clock).

Throughout Europe, masters generally taught a much wider variety of guards than destreza masters, who focused on the so-called "right angle", a position with the arm extended directly from the shoulder, forming a straight line from the point of the sword to the left shoulder.

Generally, destreza uses a finer graduation on the degrees of strength on the blade. Where other traditions generally recognized two degrees of strength (forte and debole), eventually expanding this to three or four parts, Destreza authors wrote about 9, 10, or even 12 "degrees" or segments on the sword.

Destreza masters paid close attention to the methods of their contemporary counterparts, both within the Iberian Peninsula and outside. Pacheco specifically argues against the works of many Italian authors in his text Nueva Sciencia (The New Science). Likewise, Thibault's work includes a section aimed at countering the techniques of Salvator Fabris. Francisco Lórenz de Rada's work also contains substantial coverage of how a diestro should oppose an Italian opponent when using sword and dagger.

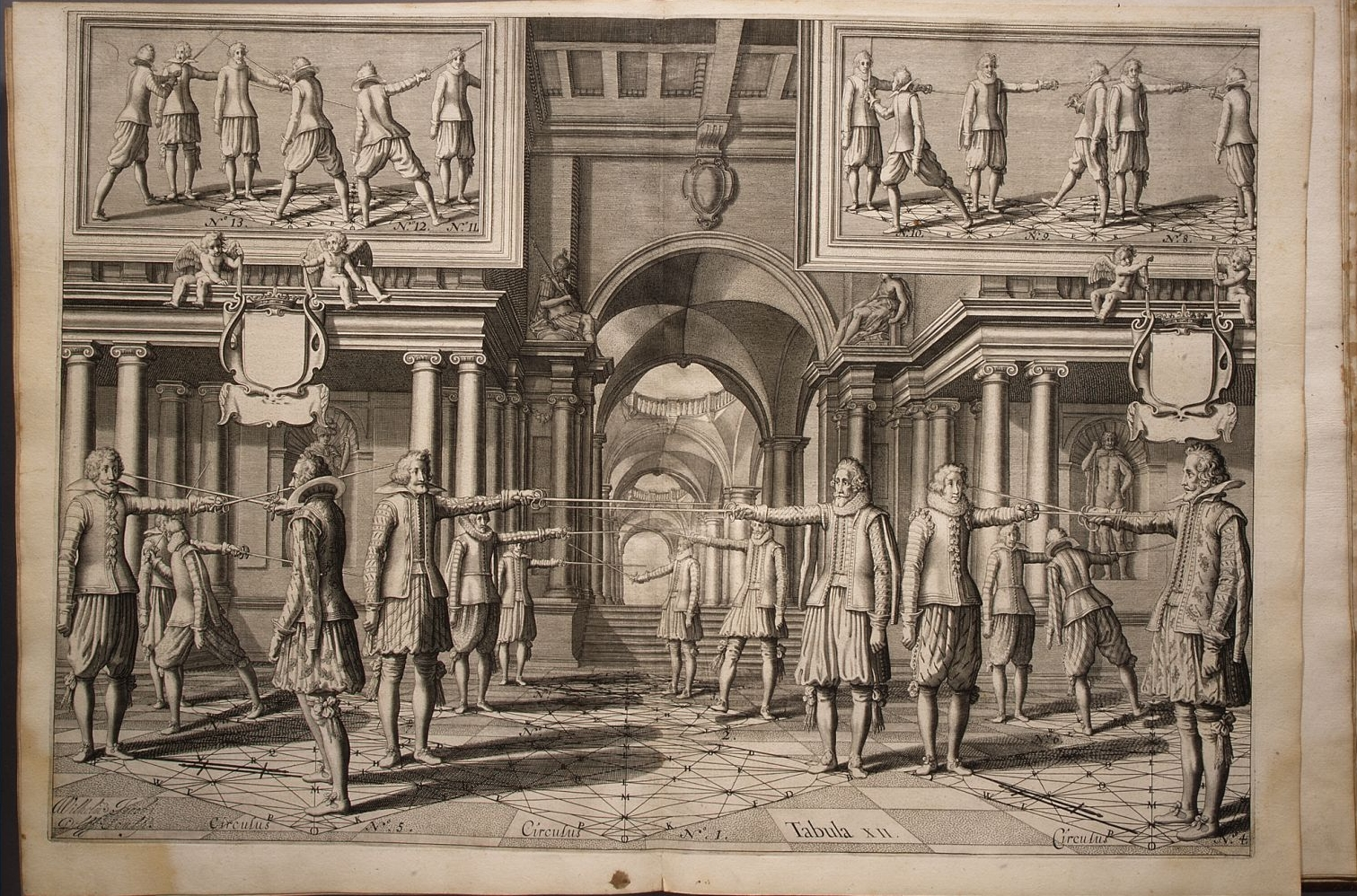
Académie de l'Espée by Girard Thibault, fig. xiii, 1628

== Primary sources ==
=== Early modern ===
- Jerónimo Sánchez de Carranza, Philosophia de las armas y de su destreza (1582)
- Luis Pacheco de Narváez, Libro de las grandezas de la espada (1600)
- Diogo Gomes de Figueiredo, Oplosophia (1628)
- Gérard Thibault d'Anvers, Académie de l'Espée (1630); trans. John Michael Greer Academy of the Sword, The Chivalry Bookshelf (2006)
- Luis Méndez de Carmona Tamariz (ca. 1639)
- Diogo Gomes de Figueiredo, Memorial Da Prattica do Montante (1651).
- Miguel Pérez de Mendoza y Quijada (1672, 1675)
- Francisco Antonio de Ettenhard (Tenarde) y Abarca
- Alvaro Guerra de la Vega (1681)
- Thomaz Luiz, Tratado das Liçoens de Espada Preta (1685)
- Francisco Lórenz de Rada (1695)
- Nicolás Tamariz, Cartilla y Luz en la Verdadera Destreza (1696)
- Manuel Cruzado y Peralta (1702)
- Francisco Lórenz de Rada (1705)

=== 19th century ===
- Manuel Antonio de Brea, Destreza del Espadin (1805)
- Simon de Frias, Tratado Elemental de la Destreza del Sable (1809)
- Jaime Merelo y Casademunt, Esgrima del Sable Español (1862)

== Popular culture ==
- El Buscón (1626) by Francisco de Quevedo ridicules a student of Pacheco's Las grandezas de la espada. The chapter ends with a mulatto fencing master who comments that "the book [...] was good but made more fools than skilled [fencers], since most did not understand it". Quevedo also composed injurious poems against Pacheco.
- The film The Mask of Zorro (1998) featured Don Diego, the original Zorro, teaching Alejandro Murrieta, the new Zorro in the destreza style.
- The television series Queen of Swords features the use of the rapier in the mysterious circle destreza style favoured by the first swordmaster of the series Anthony De Longis who studied the Spanish sword fighting technique and wanted a unique style for the heroine. He had previously used it in the episode "Duende" of the Highlander TV series where he co-choreographed his fight scenes with series swordmaster, F. Braun McAsh.
- The film Alatriste, based on the novels by Arturo Pérez-Reverte, features various characters fencing in the destreza style, including the protagonist Diego Alatriste portrayed by Viggo Mortensen.
- The 2007 Russian historical fantasy film 1612 also shows this style of fencing as an important element of the movie's plot.
- The 2019 chinese game Arknights features a character who is proficient in a style of fencing called Destreza.

== See also ==
- Swordsmanship
