= Libro de las grandezas de la espada =

16th-century Spanish treatise on fencing

The Greatness of the Sword
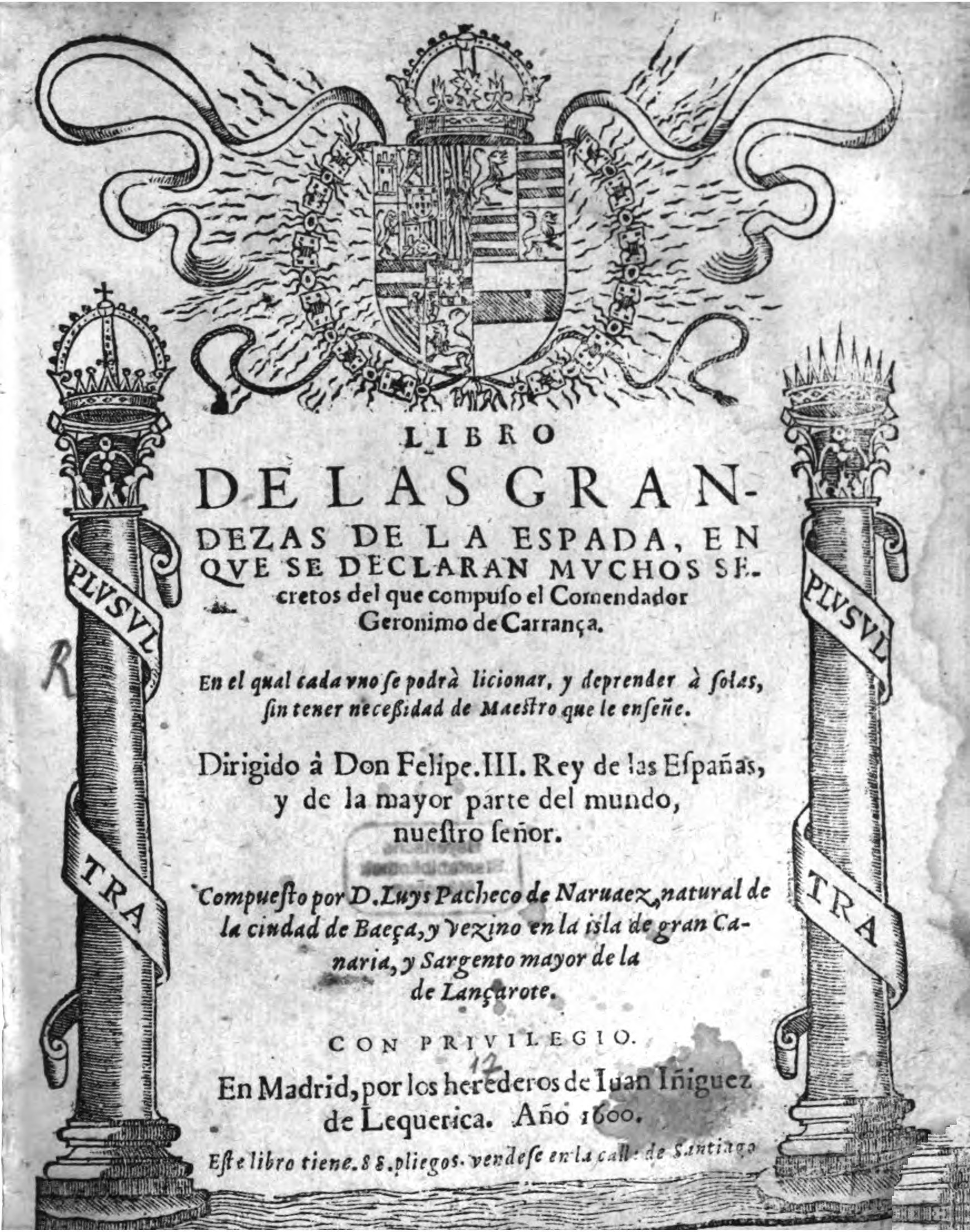
- The front (first) page
- Author: Don Luis Pacheco de Narvaez
- Language: Spanish
- Subject: Fencing
- Publication date: 1605
- Publication place: Spain

Libro de las grandezas de la espada (lit. Book of the Greatness of the Sword) is a 16th-century Spanish treatise on fencing written by Don Luis Pacheco de Narváez, who is considered one of the founding fathers of Spanish fencing (destreza) and the disciple of Jerónimo Sánchez de Carranza.

== About the treatise ==
The treatise dedicates numerous pages to the differentiation between two forms of fencing (destrezas), destreza verdadera ('true fencing') and destreza vulgar ('vulgar or common fencing'). The treatise was not officially translated into English. The treatise consists of five chapters and starts with the title page which states:

"Book of the Greatness of the Sword, in which many secrets which the Commander Jerónimo de Carranza composed, are declared. One may study the book without a maestro (teacher). Dedicated to Don Philip III King of Spain, and of the greater part of the world, our lord."

The treatise was published in Madrid, Spain, on June 17, 1599. The preface includes text on official taxation, a dedication to the king and the king's appeal.

== Contents ==
=== Prologue ===
Luis Pacheco de Narváez persuasively discusses the skill in general, as well as the reason and evidence that destreza is considered a true science.

=== First chapter ===
- Evidence that destreza and art of weapon handling is a science
- About Memory and service
- About prudence and duty
- Animo, honor

=== Second chapter ===
- Demonstrations

=== Third chapter ===
- Feints and tricks

=== Fourth chapter ===
- Peculiarities of True (Verdadera) Destreza

=== Fifth chapter ===
- What a maestro shall know to practice destreza
- Handling a sword
- Practicing with a cloak, dagger and a sword

== Criticism ==
The treatise is considered by some to be a magnificent work not only about fencing, but also about the art of living for a noble man. Indeed, the treatise is written in sophisticated language with examples from geometry, mathematics, logic, Aristotelian works, Pythagorus, as well as an explanation of human temperament types and their classification.

On the other hand, certain fencing schools of past centuries considered the work of Luis Pacheco de Narváez to be pedantic work more about mathematics and calculations than practical combat. Moreover, some people consider that Pacheco simply rewrote the work of his maestro.

The treatise dedicates numerous pages to the differentiation between destreza verdadera ('true fencing') and destreza vulgar ('vulgar or common fencing').

A second edition of Carranza's book was published in 1600, in all respects similar to the former, together with the first of that long series of works, either by Don Luis Pacheco de Narvaez or about him, which forms nearly the while forms nearly the whole literature of fencing in Spain during the seventeenth century.

— Egerton Castle, Schools and Masters of Fence (1885)

== Sources ==
- Narvaez, Pacheco de (1605). Libro de las Grandezas de la Espada. Madrid.
