= Anthony De Longis =

American actor

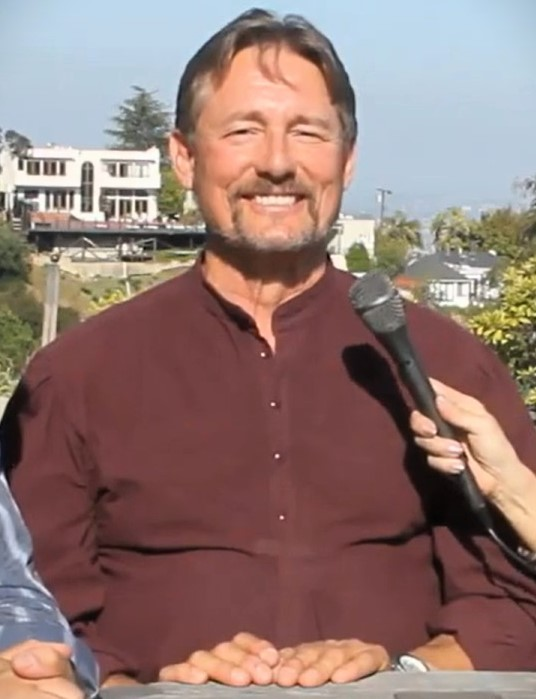
- De Longis in 2011
- Born: Anthony Charles De Longis; March 23, 1950 (age 76); Glendale, California, U.S.
- Occupations: Actor, stuntman, fight choreographer
- Years active: 1969–present
- Spouse: Dr. Mary de Longis (m. 2026)
- Website: www.delongis.com

Anthony Charles De Longis (born March 23, 1950) is an American actor, stuntman, and fight choreographer.

== Early life ==
De Longis was born in Glendale, California. He attended California State University, Northridge where he was initiated into the Phi Kappa Psi fraternity.

== Career ==
He is well known for his recurring role during the first two seasons of the TV series Star Trek: Voyager, as First Maje Jal Culluh, leader of the Kazon-Nistrim.

A very experienced swordsman, he is also known for his roles on Highlander: The Series, as Lymon Kurlow in the third-season episode "Blackmail", and as Otavio Consone in the fifth-season episode "Duende". De Longis auditioned and was considered for the lead role in the series. A martial artist and weapon master in several disciplines, he played a swordsman opposite Jet Li in the 2006 martial arts epic Fearless, and gave Harrison Ford extensive whip training for the 2008 film Indiana Jones and the Kingdom of the Crystal Skull. He also taught Michelle Pfeiffer how to use the bullwhip for her role as Catwoman in the 1992 film Batman Returns.

De Longis provided the voice of Marshal Leigh Johnson in the 2010 western video game, Red Dead Redemption. He also appeared in the downloadable content pack Red Dead Redemption: Undead Nightmare.

De Longis' best known film role was as the character Blade in the 1987 film Masters of the Universe, in which he was also Frank Langella's stunt double. He also portrayed Gary Ketchum in Road House, performing featured fights against Patrick Swayze's Dalton.

He appeared as Claus Van Zandt in 1985 on the soap opera Days of Our Lives, and as Leo Mitchell in 1989 on Santa Barbara. He has also made guest appearances on many other TV series, including Battlestar Galactica (original series), V, Babylon 5, Queen of Swords, and MacGyver. De Longis provided his voice in a Star Trek video game. De Longis was the voice actor as the main antagonist Lord Zygon in Starchaser: The Legend of Orin on 1985 film.

De Longis was also the swordmaster and stunt co-ordinator on the first six production episodes of the syndicated TV series Queen of Swords (101-107, not 105). The Queen of Swords was portrayed by newcomer Tessie Santiago and he trained her for two months in pre-production in California in the use of the rapier and dagger in the Spanish mysterious circle (Destreza) style to give the heroine a unique fighting style. He had used this style in the episode "Duende" of Highlander: The Series. He also trained Santiago in the use of the whip before moving to Texas Hollywood, Almería, Spain for the filming of the series. He appears in episode 1, "Destiny", as Maestro Torres the fencing instructor of Tessa Alvarado and episode 16, "The Hanged Man", as the ruthless Krane of the title. In the series he trained guest stars Bo Derek and Cristián de la Fuente and also doubled for him.

In 1999, De Longis formed Palpable Hit Productions, a production company specializing in bladed weapons and bullwhip training videos. The initial productions presented swordplay for performance, but in 2002 branched out to include historically correct combative fencing techniques in conjunction with the Martinez Academy of Arms.

In 2009, De Longis appeared on an episode of the Deadliest Warrior as an expert for the weapons and tactics used by William Wallace.

In 2015, De Longis appeared on an episode of MythBusters, teaching Adam Savage and Jamie Hyneman how to use a bullwhip so they could test Indiana Jones myths.

In 2018, De Longis appeared as a guest on an episode of Good Mythical Morning in which he whipped Rhett McLaughlin on the buttocks. In April 2023, De Longis returned to the show, prompting Rhett & Link to play a memory game revisiting the details of his initial appearance.

== Personal life ==
He and his wife live at Rancho Indalo, Canyon Country.

== Filmography ==
=== Acting ===
==== Film ====
Years	Title	Role	Notes
2018	Fallen Angel	Spear Man	Short
2018	Dead Men	Anson Cardena	
2016	Six Gun Savior	Rex Cooper	
2016	Duke	John Wayne	Short
2016	The Hunted: Origins	Vincent	Short
2016	Tower of Joy: A Game of Thrones FanFilm	Lord Commander Gerold Hightower	Short
2016	The Code of Cain	Kidnapper	
2015	Boomerang Returns	Vic	Short
2014	Rise of the Lonestar Ranger	Jeff Ake	
2013	Nightcomer	'Tex'	
2013	Gangster Squad	Burbank Jail Thug	
2012	Cowboy Creed	Sheriff Graves	Short
2012	Day for Knight	Narrator	Short
2011	Last Words	Cavalryman	Video short
2010	Overlords, Incorporated	Vincent Marlowe	Short
2010	Blood Trail	The Master	Short
2006	Fearless	Anthony Garcia	
1995	Expect No Mercy	Damian	
1993	CIA II: Target Alexa	Gate Mercenary	Credited as Anthony DeLongis
1992	Batman Returns	Terrifying Clown #2	Uncredited
1989	Road House	Gary Ketchum	
1987	Masters of the Universe	Blade	
1987	The Chipmunk Adventure	Klaus Furschtein (voice)	
1986	Dangerously Close	Smith Raddock	
1985	Starchaser: The Legend of Orin	Lord Zygon (voice)	
1984	3 Days	Jesus	
1984	The Warrior and the Sorceress	Kief	Credited as Anthony DeLongis
1982	The Sword and the Sorcerer	Rodrigo	
1979	Jaguar Lives	Bret Barrett	
1978	Circle of Iron	Morthond	
1976	Swashbuckler	Soldier in Bar	Uncredited
1969	The Gay Deceivers		Uncredited

==== Television ====
Year	Title	Role	Notes
1976	The Quest	Red	Episode: "Day of Outrage"
1977	Family	Tony	Family: "Someone's Watching"
1977	Quincy, M.E.	Russell	Episode: "Has Anybody Here Seen Quincy?"
1977	Logan's Run	Ketcham	Episode: "Logan's Run"
1978	The Hardy Boys/Nancy Drew Mysteries	Sergio Morse	Episode: "Campus Terror"
1979	Battlestar Galactica	Taba	2 episodes
1982	Strike Force	Dennis	Episode: "Lonely Ladies"
1984	General Hospital	Irving	Unknown episodes
1984	Matt Houston	Klein	Episode: "Criss-Cross"
1984	The A-Team	Tony	Episode: "Harder Than It Looks"
1984	Trapper John, M.D.	Mick Taggart	Episode: "The Fred Connection"
1984	The Master	Draper	Episode: "The Java Tiger"
1984	Velvet	Rawls	TV movie
1984	V	Ghalen	Episode: "The Dissident"
1984	Murder, She Wrote	Serge Berensky	Episode: "Death Takes a Curtain Call"
1982-1985	The Dukes of Hazzard	Slade / Norton	2 episodes
1985	Days of Our Lives	Claus Van Zandt	Unknown episodes
1986	The Twilight Zone	Thompson	Episode: "The Convict's Piano"
1984-1987	The New Mike Hammer	Jack Cooley / David Cardell	2 episodes
1987	She's the Sheriff	The Butterfly	Episode: "Butterfly Is Free"
1986-1987	MacGyver	Major Nikolai Kosov / Piedra - Assassin	3 episodes
1987	Moonlighting	Chain Gang Soloist	Episode: "Cool Hand Dave: Part 2"
1987	Simon & Simon	Zorn	Episode: "You, Too, Can Be a Detective"
1988	Sledge Hammer!	Arvin Swenson	Episode: "Suppose They Gave a War and Sledge Came?"
1988	High Mountain Rangers	Ivan Denisovitch	Episode: "Asylum"
1988	Houston Knights	Corliss	Episode: "For Caroline"
1989	Santa Barbara	Leo Mitchell	Unknown episodes
1990	Days of Our Lives	Hans	Episode #1.6290"
1993	Renegade	Pastorini / Frank Sand	2 episodes
1995–1996	Star Trek: Voyager	First Maje Jal Culluh	5 episodes
1996	Pacific Blue	Travis Morell	Episode: "Rapscallions"
1996	Babylon 5	Harry	Episode: "Whatever Happened to Mr. Garibaldi?"
1994-1997	Highlander: The Series	Otavio Consone / Lymon Kurlow	2 episodes
1997	Goosebumps	Man in Black	Episode: "Don't Go to Sleep"
1997	Conan	Prince Shadizar	Episode: "The Curse of Afka"
1998	The Adventures of Sinbad	Malek	Episode: "The Gryphon's Tale"
1998	The Adventures of Shirley Holmes	Vern	Episode: "The Case of the Galloping Ghost"
2000-2001	Queen of Swords	Maestro Juan Torres, Krane	2 episodes "Destiny", " Hanged Man"
2001	The Outer Limits	Commander McCarty	Episode: "The Vessel"
2001	MythQuest	Sir Lancelot	Episode: "Sir Caradoc at the Round Table"
2002	Ariana's Quest	Tarak	TV movie
2004	ER	EMT	Episode: "Try Carter"
2005	Las Vegas	Very Big Guy	Episode: "Double Down, Triple Threat"
2007	The War at Home	Fencing Instructor	Episode: "A Bitter Pill to Swallow"
2007	Mr. and Mrs. Smith	Hajek Bodyguard #1"	TV Short
2008	The Riches	Redneck	Episode: "Trust Never Sleeps"
2008	iCarly	Emile	Episode: "iFence"
2009	Leverage	Butcher of Kiev	Episode: "The Wedding Job"
2009	Lock N' Load with R. Lee Ermey	Himself	2 episodes
2009	Deadliest Warrior	Member of Team William Wallace	"Episode 8: William Wallace vs. Shaka Zulu"
2010	Justified	Rufus	Episode: "Bulletville"
2011	The AOF Channel	Anthony De Longis	5 episodes
2009–2011	The Hunted	Vincent	6 episodes
2012	Grimm	Judge Logan Patterson	Episode: "Game Ogre"
2012	NCIS	Whipcord	Episode: "Secrets"
2012	Happily Never After	Bruce Cleland	Episode: "Weeping Widow"
2014	Revolution	Head Ranger	Episode: "S#!& Happens"
2014	Ride the Lightning	Bill Dixon	Episode: "Vengeance Part 3"
2014	NCIS: Los Angeles	Harrison Goodsell	Episode: "The Grey Man"
2015	The Millers	The Pope	Episode: "When the Pope Comes Marching In"
2015	The Story of Billy the Kidd	Sheriff Gary Kidd	TV movie
2015	MythBusters	Himself	Episode: "Indiana Jones Special"
2017	Rusty Revolver: Origin	The Sunset Comanche	Episode: "Pilot"
2017	Midnight, Texas	Plantation Master	Episode: "Lemuel, Unchained"
2018	Arrested Development	Mr. F #2	3 episodes

==== Video games ====
Year	Title	Role
1992	Star Trek: 25 Anniversary	Federation Admiral
1993	Star Trek: Judgment Rites	Adm. Richards, Commander, Curator Breznia
2000	Fear Effect	Jacob "Deke" DeCourt
2010	Red Dead Redemption: Undead Nightmare	Marshal Leigh Johnson
2010	Red Dead Redemption	Marshal Leigh Johnson
2011	Resistance 3	Mick Cutler, Martin, Ray
2011	Might & Magic Heroes VI	Hiroshi
2011	Bulletstorm	General Victor Sarrano
2012	Hitman: Absolution	Hope Cops, Supporting Cast
2014	Wasteland 2	Pistol Pete
2020	Wasteland 3	Male Nightclub Bouncer, Flab the Inhaler, Percival Wesson, Ranch Leader, Marshal Lupinski
2026	Grand Theft Auto VI	The Local Population

=== Stunts/miscellaneous ===
- Good Mythical Morning (2018) - volunteered in Rhett and Link's mirror-touch synesthesia experiment
- MythBusters (2015) - helped teach Adam and Jamie how to use a bullwhip to test Indiana Jones myths
- DC Nation Shorts (2011) - tested Green Arrow's boxing glove arrow
- La Verdadera Destreza: The True Art and Style of Spanish Swordsmanship (1999/2001) [with Maestro Ramon Martinez]
- Queen of Swords (2000) - first six production episodes as swordmaster/stunt co-ordinator
- Final Round (1994)
- Far and Away (1992)
- Dangerously Close (1986)

== Honours ==
- Sovereign's Medal for Volunteers (1 August 2016).

== See also ==
- Roberta Brown
