= Masters of Defence =

Guild of combat teachers

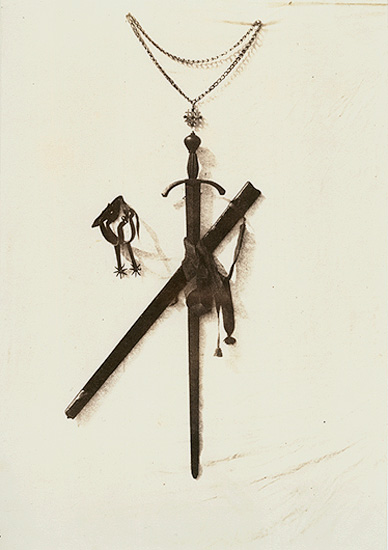
A. Salzmann - Épée de Godefroy de Bouillon - Jerusalem

Masters of Defence or Masters of Fencing is a widespread guild of teachers specializing in close combat military techniques with weapons, civilian fighting skills, and unarmed combat. The title was coined during the medieval period, and referred to men who were particularly skilled at the art of fighting.

== Beginning ==
The first Master known to history, at least according to this article, is Master Roger (known as le Skirmisour) of 1311 London.

The Masters of Defence within Germany were the first to organize themselves into guilds, such as the 1480 Marxbrüder. Other guilds included the Company of St Luke (Luxbrueder) and the Federfechter.

== Later ==
=== Organisation ===
Prior to the year 1540, Henry VIII of England, established the Corporation of the Masters of Defence. During 1540, an order was given to nine Masters of Fence and eleven provosts to seek out other individuals acting as instructors who were of lower-standing and ill-repute, which included details of the rules of expected behavior and right conduct for those so-called Masters. In addition, fencing schools were already made party to the rules of law during the same time-period. At about 1570, the ruler of the nation of France recognized the first association of fencing masters of his country.

During the late nineteenth century and twentieth century, there were a number of masters originating in the countries of Belgium, France, Italy, and Hungary, who migrated to the United States of America.

=== Personages ===
Fencing Masters known to history were Captain Caizo (circa sometime a little prior to July 1547), teacher of Le Sieur de Jarnac (who famously fought Lord Chastaigneraie in a duel); the 16th century Italian masters Agrippa, (Rocco Bonetti c.1570), Capo ferro, Di Grassi, Fabris, Giganti, Marozzo, and Viggiani; Jean Baptiste le Perche du Coudray (c.1603, French); Wilhelm Kreussler father of the Kreussler dynasty, Wernesson de Liancour (c.1686); Sir William Hope (1660-1729); Henry Blackwell; James Figg (champion of the Corporation of Masters of Defence); Heinrich Wilhelm Kreussler a member of Germany's most important master fencing dynasties and teacher of Anthon Friedrich Kahn (18th century); Domenico Angelo; La Boiëssière père and Joseph Boulogne, joint inventors of the fencing mask (c.18th century); Sainct Didier, the supposed father of modern fencing; and General Franz Siegel, the master of the first fencing school in the USA at the New York turnverein (circa.1851).

== Publications ==
Between the 13th and 17th centuries, there were more than one hundred manuals of martial defense created by these Masters.

Jean Baptiste le Perche du Coudray (c.1603) was the first of France's modern masters to publish.

There is a 1711 publication by Zach Wylde on the subject.

Amongst others, Egerton Castle wrote a text entitled Schools and Masters of Fencing: From the Middle Ages to the Eighteenth Century.

== See also ==
Royal Armouries Ms. I.33
