= Ray Martinez =

Ray or Raymond Martinez may refer to:

- Ray Martínez (born 1950), Cuban musician
- Ray Martinez (politician), member of the Arizona House of Representatives
- Ray Martinez, British guitarist, session musician and member of the English band Spring (1971-1972)
- Raymond P. Martinez, American government official

== See also ==
- Ramon Martinez (disambiguation)
- Martínez (surname)
