= Ramon Martinez (fencing instructor) =

American master of fencing

Maestro Ramón Martínez is an American master of classical and historical fencing. He studied classical fencing with the late Maître d'Armes Frederick Rohdes in New York City for ten years. Maître Rohdes was one of the last fencing masters to teach fencing as a martial art, himself having learned a variety of historical fencing systems from his own master, Maître d'Armes Marcel Cabijos. During that time Mr. Martínez became assistant and protégé of Maître Rohdes and was the only one of his pupils permitted to teach with full authorization at the Rohdes Academy.

In all, Maestro Ramon Martínez has devoted over 40 years to the study and teaching of classical fencing. He has also done extensive research in historical fencing. Many of the most prominent masters of the past centuries left elaborate, highly detailed treatises of the systems and styles which they taught. Ramon Martínez has spent years carefully and thoroughly researching these treatises in an effort to accurately reconstruct these varied styles. These ancient and historical forms are then taught as authentically as possible to those of his students who are interested. Ramon Martínez' goal is to teach, promote, and preserve this rare martial art.

Ramon Martínez is a past president of the Association for Historical Fencing (AHF), founded to promote, preserve and revive classical and historical fencing. He is also one of the founders of the International Masters at Arms Federation (IMAF).

Furthermore, Ramon Martínez is a researcher on the Spanish system of swordsmanship "La Verdadera Destreza", codified throughout the historical period known as "Siglo de Oro Español", having studied the old fencing techniques developed by such Masters as Don Jerónimo Sánchez de Carranza and Don Luis Pacheco de Narváez, among others.

He is recognized as a leading instructor in classical and historical fencing both in the U.S. and abroad, being considered a teacher on traditional fencing systems to other renowned members of the HEMA community, such as Cecil Longino, founder and head instructor of Academia della Spada in Seattle, Washington and Maestro Alberto Bomprezzi, founder and president of the Spanish Association for Historical Fencing (AEEA).

Ramon Martínez is a frequent instructor at the International Swordfighting and Martial Arts Convention (ISMAC), held in Detroit, Michigan every year. He is also a director of The Grand Assault of Arms, an annual open classical fencing tournament organized by the AHF in New York City.
