= Jan van Haelbeck =

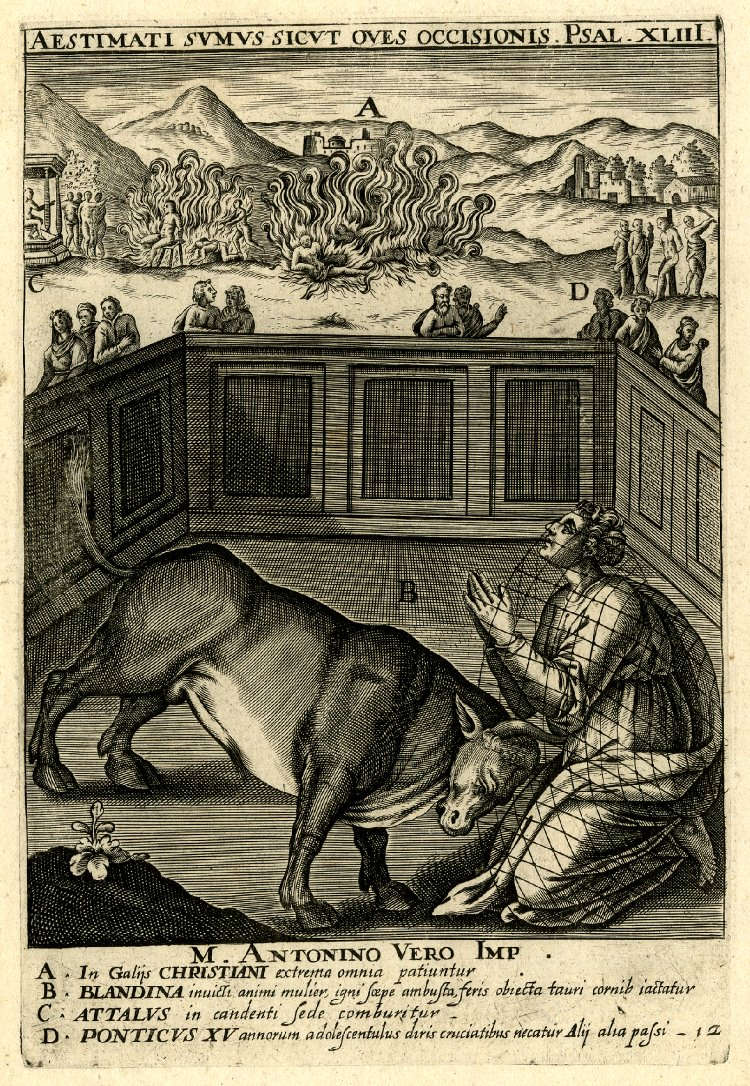
Ecclesiae Militantis Triumphi - Aestimati sumus sicut

Jan van Haelbeck or Jan van Haelbeeck (fl 1600 - 1630) was a Flemish engraver. He was mainly active in Paris in the first 30 years of the 17th century and helped introduce copper engraving as a technique in French printing. He worked on various publication projects on religious and worldly subjects and portraits.

== Life ==
Very little is known about the life of Jan van Haelbeck. It is known he was active in Paris roughly between 1600 and 1630. In Paris, he was part of a group of émigré Flemish engravers who helped transform French engraving practices. The Flemish engravers popularized copper engraving as a technique in French printing. They also introduced certain compositional schemes and subjects such as portraiture familiar to Flemish printmakers into French publishing.

Van Haelbeck is known to have had a relationship with the Copenhagen royal court and is sometimes referred to as the court artist of King Christian IV of Denmark. He was one of the principal artists who contributed the illustrations to Italian fencing master Salvator Fabris' Lo Schermo, overo Scienza d’Arme, which was published in 1606 in Copenhagen with royal support. The publication was the first publication made with copperplates in Denmark. It is possible that van Haelbeck was visiting or working in Copenhagen around 1624.

Jan van Haelbeck is assumed to have died in Paris around 1630.

Jan van Haelbeck was formerly believed to be identical with the painter who is known as the Monogrammist JVH as that artist’s paintings were only signed with the monogram JVH. The Monogrammist JVH was responsible for four religious paintings now in the collection of the Museum Catharijneconvent. It is now clear that the two artists are not identical.

== Work ==
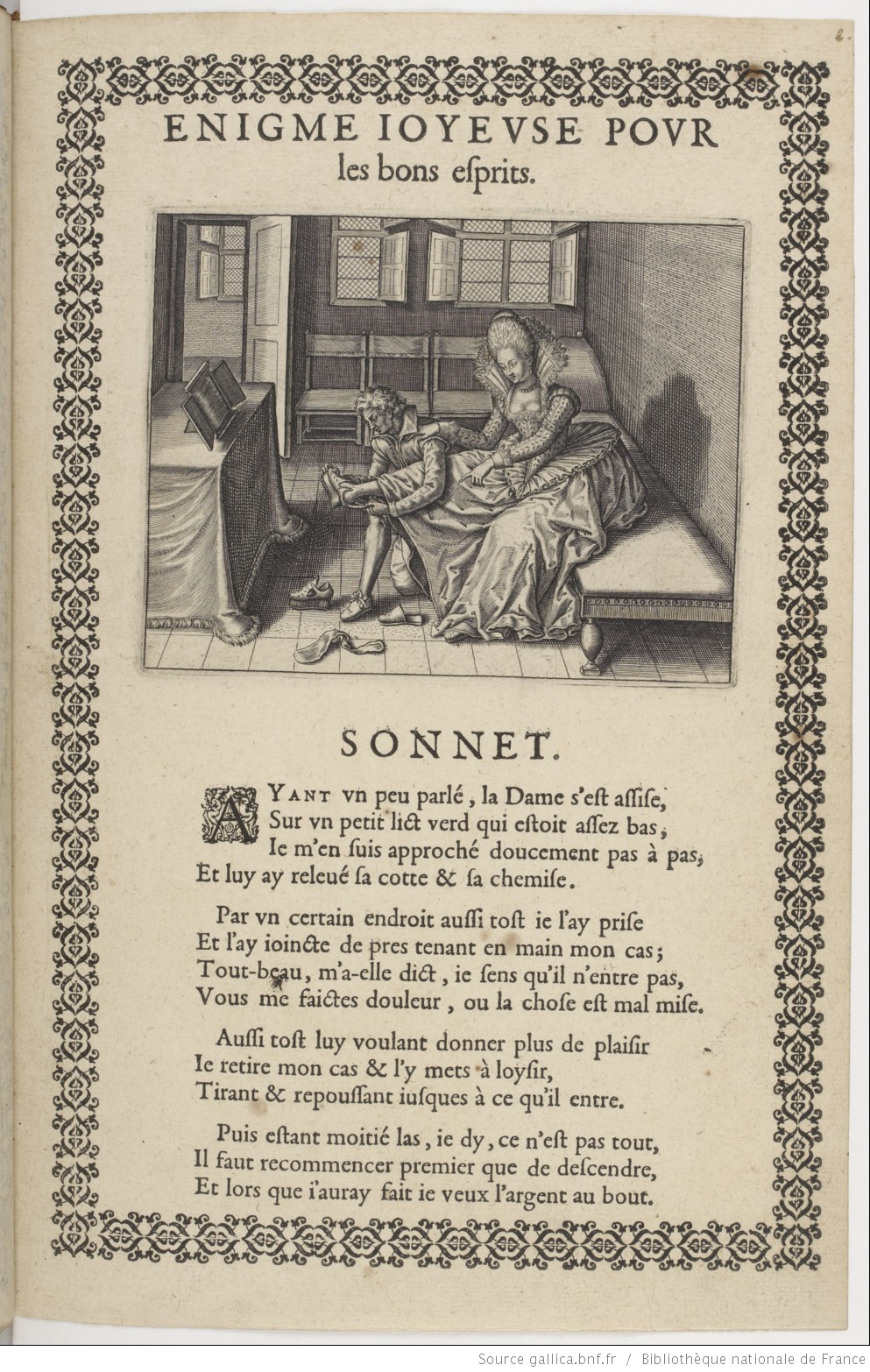
Enigme joyeuse pour les bons esprits

Jan van Haelbeck worked on many publication projects. Some of these were original creations. Others were re-engravings of popular works published earlier. An example of the latter is the publication Ecclesiae Militantis Triumphi published by Jean Leclerc IV in Paris in the early 1600s. This publication was a reworking in laterally reversed format of a 1585 Jesuit publication, which comprised 32 prints engraved by Giovanni Battista de'Cavalieri depicting in graphic detail the martyrdoms of various saints.

It is believed that Jan van Haelbeck made the engravings for the Livre de portraiture d’Annibal Carrache, a study book on portrait drawing by Annibale Carracci which was published in 1667 by François de Poilly in Paris.

Jan van Haelbeck engraved a series of prints, which were published in Paris by Jean Leclerc IV around 1615 under the title Énigme joyeuse pour les bons esprits. The images created by van Haelbeck are accompanied by verses in French that are full of double-entendres of an obscene nature. Van Haelbeck’s series was very popular and was regularly reprinted as illustrations in publications of an indelicate sort that were principally marketed to Europe’s university students. Versions of various of the engravings appear, for instance, in a number of tomes by German printmaker Peter Rollos the Elder, published in Germany between 1619 and the late 1630s.

Jan van Haelbeck produced a number of portraits including of Henri IV of France and the Venetian doge Leonardo Donato.

== Principal publications ==
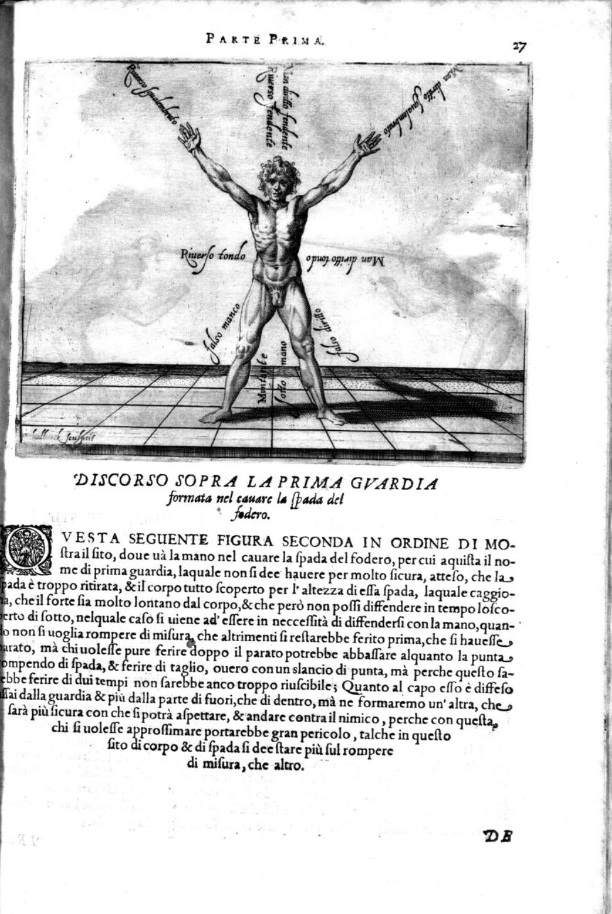
De lo Schermo overo Scienza d'Arme

- 'Retrato de Leonardo Donato' [print]
- 'Solitudo sive Vitae Patrum Eremicolarum', published in Paris by Jean Leclerc IV (ca. 1560-1633). Inverted copy after a similarly titled publication by Jan Sadeler I
- Di Salvator Fabris, Capo dell'Ordine dei sette Cori., 'De lo Schermo overo Scienza d'Arme', Copenhagen, Henrico Walkirch, 1606, in-folio, 2 parti in un volume, 3 ff. nn. 256 pp
- Jean Riolan, Jan : van Haelbeck, Giovanni Battista Coccini, 'Riolani Ambiani viri clarissimi Opera omnia. Tam hactenus edita, quàm postuma, authoris postrema manu exarara & exornata: quibus vniuersam medicinam fideliter & accuraté descripsit, atque illustrauit'. - Parisiis ex officina Plantiniana, apud Hadrianum Perier, via Iacobaea, 1610
- 'Christophori Clavii ... In sphaeram Ioannis de Sacro Bosco commentarivs', Lugduni : Sumptibus Petri Rigaud (ex typis Amedei Polerii), 1618
- 'Enigme joyeuse pour les bons esprits', Published by Jean Leclerc IV in Paris in 1615
- 'Estampas de las principales festividades del año y de los santos mas notables en cada mes : item cinco series de vidas de varios santos y otros asuntos sagrados'
- 'Figurae libri Apocalypsis beati Joannis apostoli ...', published by Jean Leclerc IV in Paris c. 1600
- 'Livre de portraiture d'Anib. Carrache', published by François de Poilly in Paris in 1667
- 'Mars est assis dans un char traîné par deux lions', published by Leclerc IV in Paris in 1613
- 'Oraculum Anachoreticum', published by Leclerc IV in Paris in 1620. Inverted copy after a similarly titled publication by Jan Sadeler I
