= Luis Pacheco de Narváez =

Spanish writer (1570–1640)

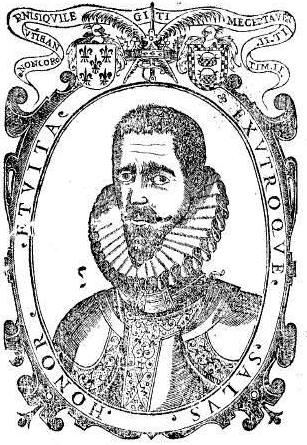
- Luis Pacheco de Narváez
- Born: 1570
- Died: 1640 (aged 69–70)
- Occupations: Writer, fencing master
- Writing career
- Notable work: Libro de las grandezas de la espada

Don Luis Pacheco de Narváez (1570–1640) was the first Spanish writer to make destreza, the Spanish art of fencing a complete philosophical fencing system.

He was probably initially inspired by the work of Don Jerónimo Sánchez de Carranza. Some of his earlier works were compendia of Carranza's work while his later works distantiate and contradict Carranza. He served as fencing master to King Philip IV of Spain.

Nevertheless, Pacheco probably never met the intellectual precursor of the destreza system Jerónimo Sanchez de Carranza.

== Biography ==
Until recently, there has been no information on the exact date of birth of Pacheco de Narváez. Born in the city of Baeza, his life was devoted to working with weapons and becoming a sergeant major in the Canary Islands, namely on the island of Fuerteventura and Lanzarote.

According to documents from the legacy of Pacheco de Narváez in the Canary Islands, it is known that he was the son of Rodrigo Marin de Narváez and Magdalena Pacheco Cameras. He married Beatriz Fernandez de Cordoba, the daughter of Michael Jerome Fernandez de Cordova, clerk of the chamber and secretary of the Royal court of the Canary Islands and Lucia Sayago.

In 1608, he allegedly had a heated debate sword in hand with Francisco de Quevedo as a result of Quevedo criticizing one of his works. Quevedo allegedly took off Pacheco's hat in the first encounter. The duel is considered a myth by experts, noting its virtual absence from all records other than Quevedo's biographer Pablo Antonio de Tarsia. Quevedo himself never mentioned it in his writings or boasted of defeating Narváez, nor their contemporaries recount any similar story between them.

In Quevedo's picaresque novel El Buscón, his enmity with Narváez was parodied with a fencer relying on mathematical calculations having to run away from a duel with an experienced soldier.

== The life of a swordsman ==
Despite the lack of accurate data on the life of Pacheco de Narváez, as well as numerous other masters of medieval fencing, there are often occasional references, from which it is clear that the profession of the fencing master in Spain in the 15th and 16th centuries required serious preparation, extreme physical strength, and organization; thus, there existed a monopoly on teaching and awarding the title of master of the art of fencing.

I was born with an innate fighting bias, just put my feet on the threshold of life and new forces, hit my ears in the ears and a special surprise was caused by the book Carranza.

— Luis Pacheco de Narvaez

Don Jerónimo Sánchez de Carranza, a lawyer and very skilled fencer considered nowadays the precursor of the Spanish school of fencing, destreza, became famous for his written treatise La filosofía de las armas y de su destreza, y de la agresión y defensa cristiana ('The philosophy of arms and their skill, and of Christian aggression and defense', published in 1582) and could have been the intellectual inspiration for Pacheco de Narváezs early works.

Pacheco de Narváez was a military man who served on both land and sea as a soldier, sergeant, ensign, sergeant major, and later governor.

== Libro de las grandezas de la espada ==
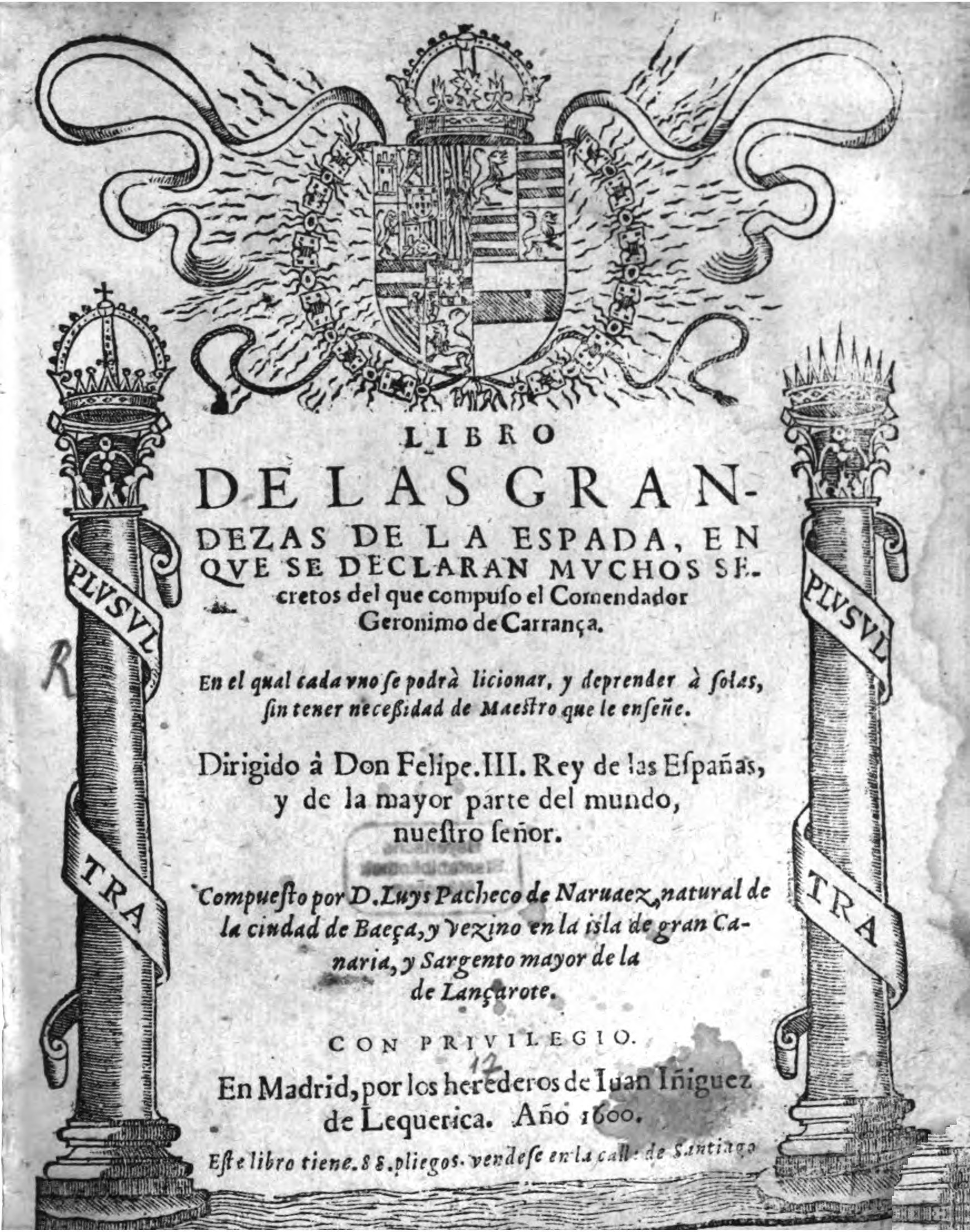
Libro de las grandezas de la espada, 'Book of the Greatness of the Sword'

Libro de las grandezas de la espada ('Book of the Greatness of the sword') by Pacheco de Narváez formed the basis of all 17th-century Spanish fencing literature. The first edition includes all the principles that Narváez handed to Carranza.

Libro de las grandezas de la espada was written in the city of Seville and is dedicated to Philip III, the "king of all Spain and the greater part of the world". Pacheco de Narváez reproduces in detail the inventor's characteristic methods and explains the curious schemes, with drawn circles and positions of the blades relative to each other – in the form of conditional swords, intersecting at different angles depending on the type of movement, the cutting or piercing stroke.

After extensive and detailed arguments on the need for defense, as required by human and divine laws, as well as arguments on the elevation of self-perfection through the art of possession of arms, the author consecrates his wisdom and practice in the art of fencing.

Fencers need to take a stand outside the defined man of proportion in order to systematize the general concept of the right means, Narváez represent a circle drawn on the ground – "circonferencia imaginata entre los cuerpos contrarios" an 'imaginary circumference around the opposing bodies', which further outlines the actions.

Carranza paid the most attention to cutting strokes, although he was very free to use stabbing blows in the fight. He presents the exact definition of the first strike, but does not explain the second one in any way. Narváez, however, touched on his work in thrusting strikes, but did not give any detailed explanation as to how he performed it.

== Modo fácil y nuevo para examinarse los maestros en la destreza de las armas ==
Modo fácil y nuevo para examinarse los maestros en la destreza de las armas ('New and easy way to examine masters in the dexterity of weapons') is another of Pacheco de Narváez's most famous works (a dialogue between a pupil and an exam teacher on the new fencing system that got obligatory by law in Spain).

The book at that time was published by the Cabinet of Lazaro de los Ríos, Secretary of the King of Spain, dated 26 February 1625 in Madrid.

This treatise contains a dialogue between the student and his teacher-examiner on the art of fencing and philosophy for obtaining the degree of maestro.

Pacheco de Narváez received gratitude from the king and was appointed examiner for all fencing teachers; however, instead of passing the exams, apparently, his comrades decided to unite against him. This can be concluded by analyzing the index la Matrícula de Yarza – a list of people who have been enrolled. The index is in the archives of the Supreme Court. It says the following:

Teachers of martial arts are suing Don Luis Pacheco de Narvaez, who must take the exam from all teachers.

— Luis Pacheco de Narváez, Letter L, file 4, 732

The protective pillars described in the treatise meet the requirements, correspond to the laws of justice and peace in the Republic. Each valiant knight was given a crown as a sign of wisdom and skill. Dialogue is based on these two principles. In the text, training with weapons is described. Also in this part, a thorough assessment of the most talented students is conducted. It is said that they are allocated a scholarship for the time devoted to studies. Such a person should be greeted favorably – the other, who from greed desires to receive the honor of receiving a scientific award – should not be despised or avoided working with. The involuntary ignoring of a person is not a significant mistake, but ignorance of what is necessary is disrespect to oneself. And above all, absurd talent and a lack of courage lead to a loss of hope to achieve what is possible, says Pacheco de Narváez.

This treatise is useful in studying the history of the art of possession of weapons, so intellectuals consider it valuable. This book contributed to the re-creation of the art and describes the image of the art of fencing from the date of publication of this was addressed only thanks to various masters of fencing.

== Bibliography ==
- Libro de las grandezas de la espada, en qve se declaran mvchos secretos del que compuso el Commendador Geronimo de Carrança, Luis Pacheco de Narváez. Orbigo, 1600
- Compendio de la filosofia de las armas de Geronimo de Carrança, Luis Pacheco de Narváez por Luis Sanchez, 1612
- Сolloqvia familiaria et alia quae dam opuscula [de Erasmi de Civilitate morum puerilium] erudiendae imentuti accommodatissima opera doctisimorum... Luis Pacheco de Narváez. Claudius Bornat, 1643
- Nveva ciencia; y filosofia de la destreza de las armas, sv teorica, y practica: A la Magestad de Felipe Quarto, rey, y señor nvestro de las Españas, y de la mayor parte del mundo, Luis Pacheco de Narváez, M. Sanchez, 1672
- Modo facil y nueuo para examinar los maestros en la destreza de las armas, y entender sus cien conclusiones, ò formas de saber, Luis Pacheco de Narváez por los herederos de Pedro Lanaja, 1658
- Advertencias para la enseñanza de la filosofia, y destreza de las armas, assi à pie, como à cavallo ... por D. Luis Pacheco de Narvaez ..., Luis Pacheco de Narváez, 1642
- Historia exemplar de las dos constantes mugeres españolas ... por Don Luis Pacheco de Naruaez ..., Luis Pacheco de Narváez, Luis Imprenta del Reino (Madrid) 1635

== See also ==
- Gérard (or Girard) Thibault of Antwerp
- La Verdadera Destreza
