= Highlander: The Series season 5 =

Highlander: The Series
- Season 5
- DVD box set
- No. of episodes: 18

Release
- Original network: Syndication
- Original release: September 23, 1996 – May 19, 1997

Season chronology
- ← Previous; Season 4 Next → Season 6

The fifth season of the American drama/adventure television series Highlander began airing 23 September 1996 and finished on 19 May 1997. The series continues to follow the adventures of Duncan MacLeod, a 400-year-old Immortal who, just as the Immortals of the movies, can only die if he is beheaded. MacLeod is involved in the Game, an ongoing battle during which all Immortals have to behead each other until only one is left.

== Production ==
Two episodes that aired during the fifth season were the fourth season episodes "Double Jeopardy" (aired April 28, 1997) and "One Minute to Midnight" (aired September 23, 1996). These episodes are included in the fourth season DVD set.

== Cast ==
=== Main cast ===
- Adrian Paul ... Duncan MacLeod
- Stan Kirsch ... Richie Ryan
- Jim Byrnes ... Joe Dawson

=== Recurring cast ===
- Awaovieyi Agie ... Jeffrey
- Réal Andrews ... Haresh Clay
- Claudie Arif ... Duenna
- Steve Bacic ... Luke
- Dean Balkwill ... David
- Terry Barclay ... Paco
- Geoffrey Bateman ... Richard Dunbar
- Jo Bates ... Glenda
- Mario Battista ... Big Gino
- Jeremy Beck ... Young Duncan MacLeod
- Sandra Bernhard ... Carolyn Marsh
- Lloyd Berry ... Harry
- Alex Bruhanski ... Reynaldo
- Lisa Butler ... Genevieve
- Felipe Calvarro ... Rafael
- Katie Carr ... Claire Clairmont
- Fulvio Cecere ... Alan Wilkinson
- Dolores Chaplin ... Theresa
- Kira Clavell ... Coyantu
- Allan Clow ... Neil MacGregor
- Sonia Codhant ... Marina LeMartin
- Kevin John Conway ... Alec Hill
- Bertie Cortez ... Dr. Cernavoda
- James Crescenzo ... Mr. Luca
- Roger R. Cross ... Derek Worth
- Roger Daltrey ... Hugh Fitzcairn
- Mitch Davies ... Captain Greenwell
- Bob Dawson ... O'Grady
- Anthony De Longis ... Otavio Consone
- Carmen du Sautoy ... Anna Hidalgo
- Nathaniel Deveaux ... Reverend Bell
- Stephen Dimopoulos ... Seth Hobart
- Andrew Divoff ... Gavriel Larca
- Alastair Duncan ... Terence Coventry
- Deborah Epstein ... Luisa Hidalgo
- Martin Evans ... Claus von Stauffenberg
- Kathy Evison ... Jennifer Hill
- Jonathan Firth ... Lord Byron
- Don Foran ... Jerry
- Elsa Franco ... Isabella
- L. Harvey Gold ... Igor Stefanovich
- Patrick Gordon ... Immortal Hermit
- Patrick T. Gorman ... Sergeant Hickson
- Elizabeth Gracen ... Amanda / 4 episodes
- Anna Hagan ... Mary Macleod
- Peter Hanlon ... Karl Brandt
- Kevin Hansen ... Clayton Hobart
- Deryl Hayes ... Andrew Beckmann
- Rachel Hayward ... Delila
- Tom Heaton ... Old Tom
- Philip Heinrich ... Bobby
- Tim Henry ... Detective Dennis Tynan
- Gary Hetherington ... Carlo Capodimonte
- Keith Holmgren ... Gerald
- Peter Hudson ... Ahriman
- Chris Humphreys ... Graham Ashe
- Michael J. Jackson ... Sean Burns
- Edward Jewesbury ... Jason Landry
- Marine Jolivet ... Inspector Begue
- Patrick Keating ... Adolf Hitler
- Tracy Keating ... Mary Shelley
- Eric Keenleyside ... Trey Franks
- Michael Kopsa ... Tommy
- Sotigui Kouyate ... Hijad
- Chris Larkin ... Steven Keane
- Nicholas Lea ... Cory Raines
- Jim Leard ... Detective Frayne / 2 episodes
- David Longworth ... Paxton
- Cluny MacPherson ... Robert Macleod
- F. Braun McAsh ... Hans Kershner
- Tom McBeath ... Sam Grinkhov
- Eric McCormack ... Matthew McCormick
- Chris William Martin ... Carter Wellan
- Greg Michaels ... Tippet
- Frank Middlemass ... Baron Lemartin
- Michel Modo ... Maurice Lalonde
- Robin Mossley ... Jimmy the Weasel
- John Novak ... Gerard Kragen
- Aaron Pearl ... Myron Corman
- Valentine Pelka ... Kronos / 3 episodes
- Ron Perlman ... The Messenger
- Gerard Plunkett ... Roland Kantos
- Christopher J.P. Racasa ... Enrique
- Emily Raymond ... Allison Landry
- Jeffrey Ribier ... Mike Paladini
- Richard Ridings ... Silas / 2 episodes
- Sylvain Rougerie ... James Foulard
- Gerry Rousseau ... Raymond Fairchild
- Tom Russell ... Edward Cervain
- Tracy Scoggins ... Cassandra / 3 episodes
- Stephen J. M. Sisk ... Tim
- Christopher Staines ... Percy Shelley
- Marcia Strassman ... Betsy Fields
- April Telek ... Roxanne
- Richard Temple ... Foster
- Marcus Testory ... Caspian / 2 episodes
- Matthew Thompson ... James
- Elisa Tonati ... Gilda
- Ian Tracey ... Johnny "K" Kelly
- Jan Triska ... Nicolae Breslaw
- Musetta Vander ... Ingrid Henning
- Astrid Veillon ... Desiree
- Marie Vernalde ... Young Anna
- Arturo Venegas ... Don Diego
- Matthew Walker ... Ian MacLeod
- Bob Wilde ... Dominic Delio
- Rhys Williams ... Talbot
- Peter Wingfield ... Methos / 7 episodes
- Robert Wisden ... William Culbraith
- Bruce A. Young ... Carl Robinson

== Episodes ==
This season follows the theme of "forgiveness or regret" as episodes focus on a character coming to terms with the consequences of their actions from their past.

No. overall	No. in season	Title	Directed by	Written by	Original release date	Prod. code
89	1	"Prophecy"	Dennis Berry	David Tynan	October 5, 1996	96501
Duncan encounters an Immortal seer, Cassandra, whom he met as a child in Scotland. Cassandra has the power to mesmerize people with her voice and seems to have other psychic gifts. She had stepped in to hide Duncan from Immortal Roland Kantos, who was out to find the child born on the winter solstice, because of a prophecy that he would fight and vanquish a great evil. Now, centuries later, Roland Kantos has found Duncan MacLeod. Like Cassandra, who apparently taught him, he has the power to mesmerize people with his voice, and captures Duncan, intending to kill him. Duncan eventually defeats Kantos, gaining the brilliant idea from talking to his younger self in a vision Cassandra helps him to have, of plugging up his ears with candle wax so that Kantos cannot control him via the voice.
90	2	"The End of Innocence"	Gerard Hameline	Morrie Ruvinsky	October 12, 1996	96502
The last time Richie Ryan saw Duncan MacLeod, Duncan was about to take his head. He was stopped by Joe's bullet, but Richie's world was shattered by what his old friend had tried to do. Now Richie's back—kicking butt and taking heads. One of those heads belonged to Carter Wellan, and now Wellan's good friend and mentor Haresh Clay is out to avenge his comrade. Duncan has his own fears and also has a long-time grudge against Clay, who humiliated and destroyed one of Duncan's finest teachers. After Duncan regains Richie's trust, he convinces him to stay back while he faces Clay. Duncan fights Clay and beheads him.
91	3	"Manhunt"	Peter Ellis	David Tynan	October 19, 1996	96503
In 1859, Carl Robinson, the former slave, completed his training under Matthew McCormick, another Immortal. Unfortunately, bad blood came between them, when Carl killed his former slave owner and as well as the owner’s son. Matthew, who was an in-law, saw this as murder and has been hunting him since. Today, now a baseball player, Carl has finally found the good life as a Major Leagues' star. However, when Carl is challenged by Immortal Myron Corman and witnesses find him standing over the decapitated body, Carl is forced to go on the run from the cops. Matthew, now an FBI Agent, is on the case, with the intention of taking Carl's head. Duncan is able to help the two let go of their anger and fake Carl’s death.
92	4	"Glory Days"	Gerard Hameline	Nancy Heiken	October 26, 1996	96504
Immortals who do not play by the rules of the Game, do not survive the Game. And those who do not change with the times are swallowed by the times; lessons Johnny Kelly/Johnny K learned too late. Johnny was killed in 1929 in a mob hit, during the glory days of organized crime. Duncan was present when Johnny met this first death, and tried to take Johnny as his student, but Johnny had other plans. He extracted vengeance on the mobster responsible for his first death and became a professional assassin. Things went well for Kelly until today, where he again encounters Duncan and tries to take the Highlander's head, only to be killed himself. Meanwhile, Joe's high school sweetheart shows up giving Joe a bittersweet reminder of his own glory days.
93	5	"Dramatic License"	Peter Ellis	Michael O'Mahoney, Sasha Reins	November 2, 1996	96505
Duncan finds himself cast in a romance novel along with an old opponent, Terence Coventry. Duncan wants to know how much the author, Carolyn Marsh, knows about him, but his rival wants to kill her, or does he? Amanda discovers the problem: Carolyn is married to Coventry but feels that she can never live up to him or the women from his past. Amanda and Carolyn find Duncan and Coventry fighting, with Amanda quickly clearing up the misunderstanding, allowing Terence and Carolyn to reconcile.
94	6	"Money No Object"	Rafal Zielinski	James Thorpe	November 9, 1996	96506
Duncan and Amanda are reunited with Cory Raines, the charming, smooth-talking "Clyde" to Amanda's "Bonnie" during their five-state crime spree in the 1920s. Amanda, always ready for a little larceny, is tempted by the carefree and adventurous lifestyle Cory offers her. She takes him up on the offer when she realizes Duncan won't beg her to stay with him. But Duncan rides to the rescue when one of Cory's schemes goes astray. In the aftermath, Cory skips down, but not before Duncan blows him up as payback.
95	7	"Haunted"	James Bruce	Scott Peters	November 16, 1996	96507
Jennifer Hill believes the spirit of her dead husband Alec, an Immortal, is still with her. She comes to Alec's old friend Duncan and begs him to appease Alec's spirit by killing Gerard Kragen, the Immortal who took Alec Hill's head. Richie finds himself strangely attracted to the grieving young widow—until she realizes he's the very same Immortal being sought by Duncan. While Duncan kills Kragen, Richie informs him that Alec picked a fight with him and he killed him in self-defense. Jennifer demands Duncan kill Richie, but Duncan refuses. She attempts to do it herself, only for Duncan to talk her out of it.
96	8	"Little Tin God"	Rafal Zielinski	Richard Gilbert-Hill	November 23, 1996	96508
Derek Worth's faith in God helped save him from a violent life on the urban streets. When the young gospel singer is killed in a drive-by shooting, he awakens in the arms of Gavriel Larca, who claims to be God and has given Derek the gift of eternal life. He even has done the same to other newbie Immortals. Derek and the other followers, Luke Sarsfield and Enrique Grimaldo are dispatched to eliminate Duncan, who Larca says is Satan. The interference of Derek’s father figure, Reverend Thomas Bell, leads to Larca killing Luke and Derek turning on Enrique. Duncan gets Thomas to safety and decapitates Larca. With Thomas already knowing the background of Derek and now knowing of the Immortals, Joe recruits him into the Watchers.
97	9	"The Messenger"	James Bruce	David Tynan	November 30, 1996	96509
An Immortal is going around pretending to be Methos, encouraging other Immortals to give up the Game. Luring Richie into this dangerous frame of mind, Duncan's fight with William Culbraith—another Immortal who led the Confederate prison camp Andersonville and whose own personal tragedy led him to give the orders that killed a mortal comrade of the Highlander's -- is interrupted. Joe warns about this phoney, who convinces Immortals to lay down their swords. But it always ends in tragedy; the converts are then killed by the next Immortal to come along, with the fake Methos continuing on his hopeless mission of preaching pacifism. An incredulous Methos confronts the impostor, and upon realizing he is genuine concludes he is daft. Culbraith, however, has other plans and takes the Messenger's head thinking he is Methos, hoping the Quickening will give him the strength to defeat Duncan. In the end, however, it is Richie who takes Culbraith's head.
98	10	"The Valkyrie"	Richard Martin	James Thorpe	February 1, 1997	96510
Ingrid Henning failed in an assassination attempt on Adolf Hitler during WWII. Since then, she has made it her mission to take out rising monsters before they can achieve political power, having concluded that Hitler's position protected him. Now, Henning is after a racist politician whose star is rising. After she plants a bomb at the venue, Duncan tells her to stop, but she no longer believes in innocence, feeling nothing when she killed bystanders. Henning wishes for a world without tyrants, but Duncan knows that can never happen. She refuses to release the detonator, so Duncan takes her head.
99	11	"Comes a Horseman"	Gerard Hameline	David Tynan	February 8, 1997	96511
Duncan renews an old battle with an Immortal he encountered in 1867 as the outlaw Melvin Koren. Duncan learns that Koren is really Kronos, who turns out to be thousands of years old and more than Duncan can handle. To make matters more complicated, Cassandra is after Kronos to settle a score of her own. During the Bronze Age, Kronos led a small band of Immortals called the Four Horsemen on a raid that destroyed the seer's village and enslaved her. When Methos is revealed to have been one of the Horsemen, Duncan tells him their friendship is over. The oldest living Immortal is forced to join up with Kronos, who has decided to reunite the Horsemen. He manages, however, to break up what was supposed to be the decisive battle between Duncan and Kronos, saying it could have gone either way.
100	12	"Revelation 6:8"	Adrian Paul	Tony DiFranco	February 15, 1997	96512
The Four Horsemen are reunited in Paris, Cassandra is their prisoner and worst of all, Methos has apparently rejoined his old comrades, guiding Kronos to their Brothers, Caspian and Silas. As Duncan makes plans to rescue Cassandra and face Kronos for the last time, Methos tries to stay alive, maybe dissuade Silas, and somehow perhaps keep Cassandra—who was his personal "pet" during her first captivity in the Bronze Age—alive, too. Kronos' plan is revealed: he intends to use an engineered virus to wipe out most of humanity and conquer the survivors as part of an eternal empire. Methos eventually betrays his former comrades, with he and Duncan simultaneously battling Kronos and Silas to the death in their own respective fights. The result is a Double Quickening as Duncan and Methos win the day. Cassandra wants to avenge herself upon Methos, her former tormentor, but Duncan demands she let him live. Whether or not the centuries have truly changed Methos after all, he was the man who saved Duncan MacLeod from the Dark Quickening, and he had in the end helped to save humanity. Afterward, Methos implies that he had set up the entire confrontation with Kronos hoping Duncan could do what he himself never could—take his Immortal brother's head.
101	13	"The Ransom of Richard Redstone"	Gerard Hameline	David Tynan	February 22, 1997	96513
The Chateau LeMartin has been in Marina's family for generations, but now the slimy Carlo Capodimonte threatens to foreclose on an old loan and take the chateau for himself. Desperate to save the family heritage, Marina kidnaps an American millionaire in order to pay off the loan. Unfortunately for Marina, the rich and charming "Richard Redstone" she has tied up in the cellar is none other than Richie Ryan. Duncan learns of this and is forced to come and get Richie out of the bind.
102	14	"Duende"	Richard Martin	Jan Hartman	March 1, 1997	96514
Spanish swordplay, like Spanish dancing, is equal parts passion, skill, and strict discipline. The Immortal Otavio Consone is a master of both. An arrogant Spaniard who 150 years ago tried to teach Duncan the sword art called "The Mysterious Circle," Consone vied with Duncan for the hand of Theresa, a beautiful senorita, with tragic results. Consone had permission to marry Theresa, due to his nobility, and Theresa only agreed if he spared Duncan, who he defeated in a match. Duncan left Spain but Consone eventually killed Theresa out of jealousy. Now today, Duncan must protect Anna Hidalgo, a flamenco artist and her daughter, Luisa, from Consone's revenge. Years prior, a pregnant Anna rejected Consone for her dance partner, who he killed in front of her. Then he crippled her for life in a car accident. Now, he has manipulated and tied the knot with Luisa, who he intends to kill to complete his vengeance. Duncan exposes the truth and challenges Consone to a rematch. After a long and difficult duel, Duncan finally beheads Consone. Anna and Luisa reconcile in the aftermath.
103	15	"The Stone of Scone"	Richard Martin	Michael O'Mahony and Sasha Reins	April 21, 1997	96515
According to official statements by the British government, the theft of the Stone of Scone, the legendary royal throne of Scotland, from Westminster Abbey in 1950 was simply a rowdy schoolboy prank. But was it? Or was it actually the bungled work of three rather hapless Immortals, attempting to fulfill a promise made centuries before?
104	16	"Forgive Us Our Trespasses"	Paolo Barzman	Dom Tordjmann	May 5, 1997	96516
After the Scottish massacre at the Battle of Culloden in 1746, Duncan MacLeod was a man possessed, obsessed, with killing the English bastards who had destroyed his people. Now Immortal Steven Keane has come to make Duncan pay for his murderous crimes. Amanda urges Duncan to take Keane's head and be done with it, Methos schools him on accepting his past as part of him, but in his heart Duncan wonders if Keane is right -- if he is a murderer. Eventually, Duncan and Keane fight on a rooftop and Duncan defeats Keane but spares his life. Duncan tells him to walk away and Keane, seeing Duncan has changed, did.
105	17	"The Modern Prometheus"	Adrian Paul	James Thorpe	May 12, 1997	96517
Lord Byron, once one of the greatest and most scandalous writers of the 19th Century, is now a rock star. Methos remembers when his escapades led to a senseless fight that ended in a quickening witnessed by Mary Shelley, author of "Frankenstein." Byron's debauchery and substance abuse have only increased with time. He lures an up-and-coming musician under Joe Dawson's tutelage into his dangerous lifestyle, and Duncan becomes involved. Tragedy finally strikes, with Joe's musical protégé dying from a drug overdose. Methos finally realizes that his former pupil is beyond hope, and Duncan fights Byron to the death.
106	18	"Archangel"	Dennis Berry	David Tynan	May 19, 1997	96518
Two archaeologists, Foster and Landry, are exploring a tunnel and they come face to face with a statue. Landry the more experienced and superstitious recognizes the statue as the ancient Zoroastrian demon Ahriman who plagues the world every thousand years by coming into human form. Foster is killed and Landry escapes. Landry warns Duncan that he is the champion who is to defeat Ahriman but both he and Richie think the man is crazy. But later Duncan sees James Horton, Kronos and other people he had killed before. Methos and Joe think he is losing it but Richie is willing to stay by his side whatever it takes. When Richie sees what looks like Horton taking Joe in a car to a racetrack with a gun to his head, Richie calls Duncan and tells him he is going after them. Duncan, who is with Joe at the time, sees that it's a trap. He gets to the racetrack and is confronted by Richie, Horton, and Kronos. Ahriman has taken their form. He fights them all, but they disappear every time he attacks them. Then the real Richie appears and Duncan, thinking it is Ahriman, delivers the fatal blow. Joe and Methos arrive just as Ahriman in Richie's form laughs and leaves. Duncan runs away in tears and Joe is left crying on Methos' shoulder. Richie is gone forever.

== Home media ==
Highlander: The Series Season Five
Set details		Special features
18 episodes; 9-disc set (8 DVDs and 1 CD-ROM); 1.33:1 aspect ratio; English (Dolby Digital 5.1); English (Dolby Digital 2.0 Stereo)		A vast library of never-before-seen footage including deleted scenes as well as recently discovered footage; Interviews with the Actors, Producers, Editors, Writers, Set and Costume Designers; Watcher Chronicles - Discover the lives of the Immortals and those they encountered as recorded by The Watchers; Photo Gallery; Audio Commentaries from: Jim Byrnes, Anthony Delongis, Peter Ellis, Gillian Horvath, Stan Kirsch, Don Paonessa, and Adrian Paul; Blooper Reel; DUELS; THE ROMANCES OF DUNCAN MACLEOD; "The Time of the Gathering: Highlander's 1998 Convention"; Peter Wingfield: The Man Who Became Methos; Original Production Designs; All 18 Scripts; Actor, Director & Writer Bios, Series Trivia, Fight Scripts, Production Notes & Shooting Schedules
Release dates
Region 1	Region 2	
August 10, 2004		
