= Nicoletto Giganti =

Italian fencer

Nicoletto Giganti was a 17th-century Italian rapier fencing master. The frontispiece of his 1606 work names him as “Nicoletto Giganti, Venetian”, although evidence suggests he or his family, moved to Venice from the town of Fossombrone, in Le Marche, Central Italy.

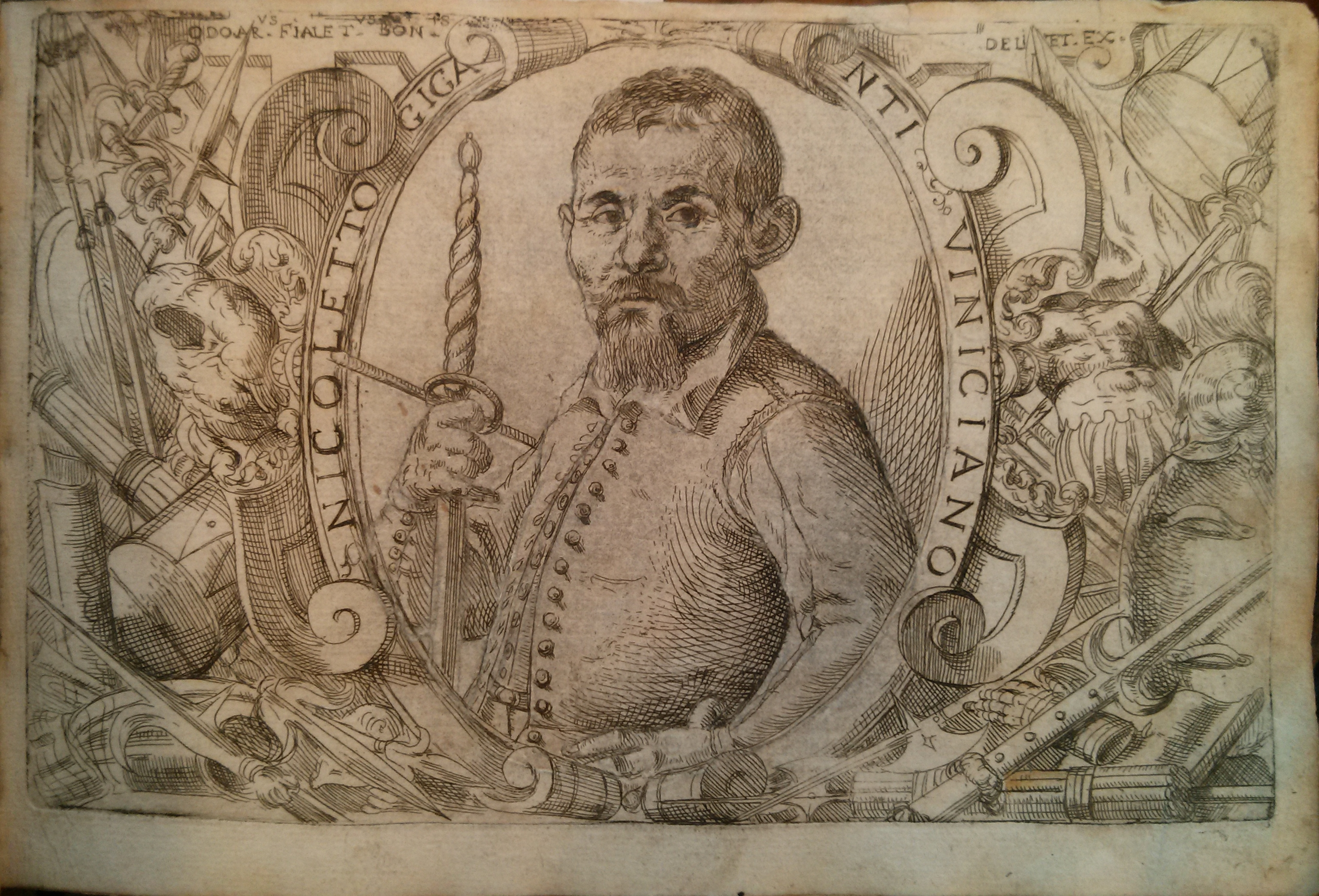
Nicoletto Giganti "Scola, overo teatro"

Little is known of Giganti’s life, but in the dedication to his 1606 treatise, he counts 27 years of professional experience, whereas the Giganti family of Fossombrone were lesser nobility, long in the military service of Venice. He is a famous representative of the Venetian school of fencing.

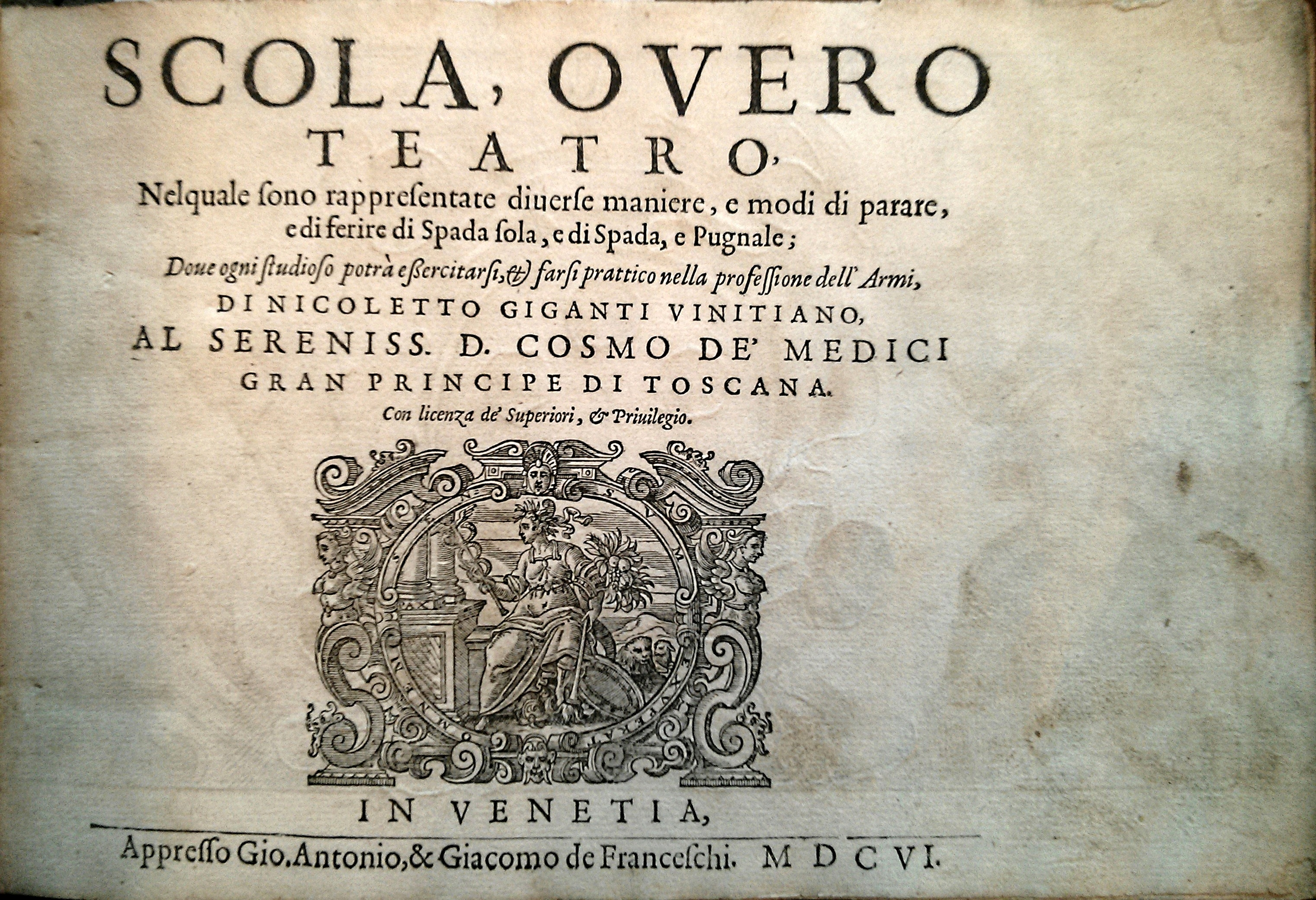
Трактат "Scola, overo Teatro". Nicoletto Giganti

His 1606 work was reprinted in Italian in 1628, and in French and German parallel translation in 1619, 1622, and 1644.

Johann Joachim Hynitzsch accuses Giganti of plagiarising Salvator Fabris in the second volume of the 1622 French and German translation of Giganti's treatise, printed in Frankfurt. This is probably unfounded, as there is no evidence that Giganti had any involvement in any of the later printings of his 1606 work. Likewise Giganti does not appear involved in the 1628 Italian edition of his own 1606 treatise, which merely reprints Giganti’s original 1606 dedication, to the by then deceased Cosimo II de' Medici, with a separate printers dedication that makes no reference to Giganti’s continuing involvement. Likewise the disputed 1622 edition contained no dedication and was likely printed by the publisher and translator, De Zetter, without consent.

On several occasions in his 1606 treatise Giganti promised a second book. This pledge appeared to have remained unfulfilled. As early as 1673 the Sicilian master Pallavicini noted with heavy irony that while he was publishing a second volume, without having undertaken to do so in his first book, other masters such as Giganti had promised a second work and not delivered.

… we should not make promises [we can't keep] to the curious. … Nicoletto Giganti promised to publish a second book, but it cannot be found

The first positive reference to a purported second book by Giganti, does not arrive until the 1847 publication of Alberto Marchionni’s Trattato di scherma:

In 1608, from the press of Giovanni Fontani of Pisa, came forth a second book of fencing by Niccoletto Giganti in which he deals with the use of the single sword, sword and dagger and also the sword and rotella, the sword and targe, the sword and buckler, the sword and cape, the dagger alone, the dagger against the spear and the dagger alone against the sword. Subsequently he discusses grabs to the weapon and pommel strikes to the face, and of other grapples advising to put your left hand over the hilt of your opponent's sword. He proposes executing the passata sotto in the tempo in which your opponent performs a cavazione on the line of terza. Finally he discusses a new guard with the sword and dagger with the left foot forward, suggesting that he proposes to publish another book where he will teach all of the actions possible with the left foot forward. This treatise is illustrated with 53 figures, very badly drawn and likewise engraved; nevertheless his treatise is filled with very useful teachings.

This work is further cited by Gelli, who merely quotes word for word from Marchionni, adding only the note 'rare work', indicating that he almost certainly had not examined the treatise himself.

The existence of this elusive second work, matching Marchionni's description, was not confirmed until the publication of an English translation by Piermarco Terminiello and Joshua Pendragon in November 2013.
