= Gérard Thibault d'Anvers =

Fencing master and writer from the Netherlands

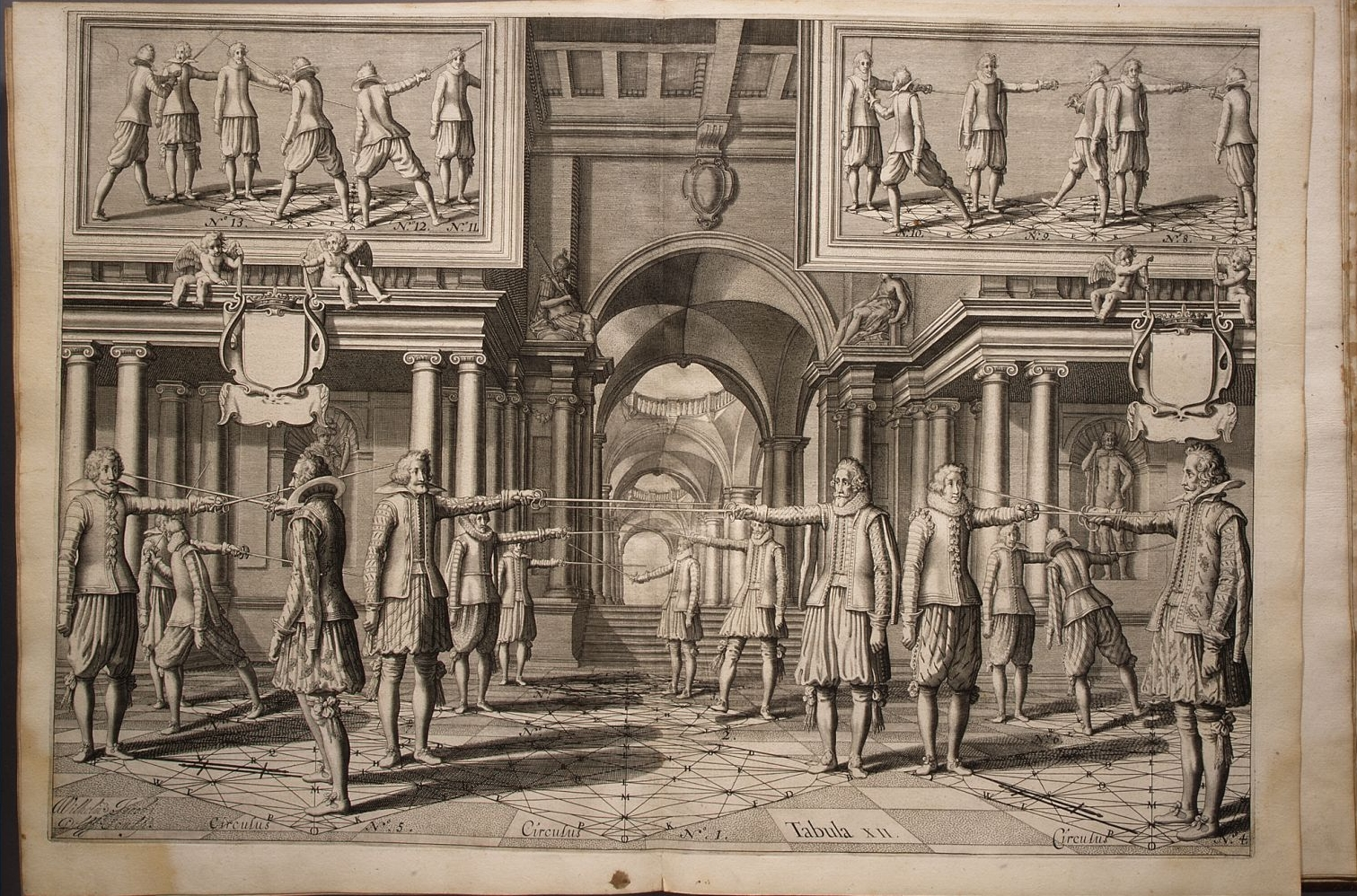
Chapter 43, Plate XII of Académie de l'Espée, describing the correct way to fight a left-handed swordsman

Gérard (or Girard) Thibault of Antwerp (ca. 1574–1627) was a fencing master and writer of the 1628 rapier manual Academie de l'Espée. Thibault was from the Southern Netherlands which is today Belgium. His manual is one of the most detailed and elaborate extant sources on rapier combat, painstakingly utilizing geometry and logic to defend his unorthodox style of swordsmanship.

Academie de l'Espée describes a unique system of combat whose closest known relative is the contemporary Spanish school of swordsmanship, also known as La Verdadera Destreza, as taught by masters such as Don Jerónimo Sánchez de Carranza and Luis Pacheco de Narváez. Not unlike the Spanish, Thibault advocated the use of upright postures, walking steps instead of lunges, and non-linear footwork. However, Thibault differed from his Spanish counterparts in many areas, including his preferred stance and grip.

== Biography ==
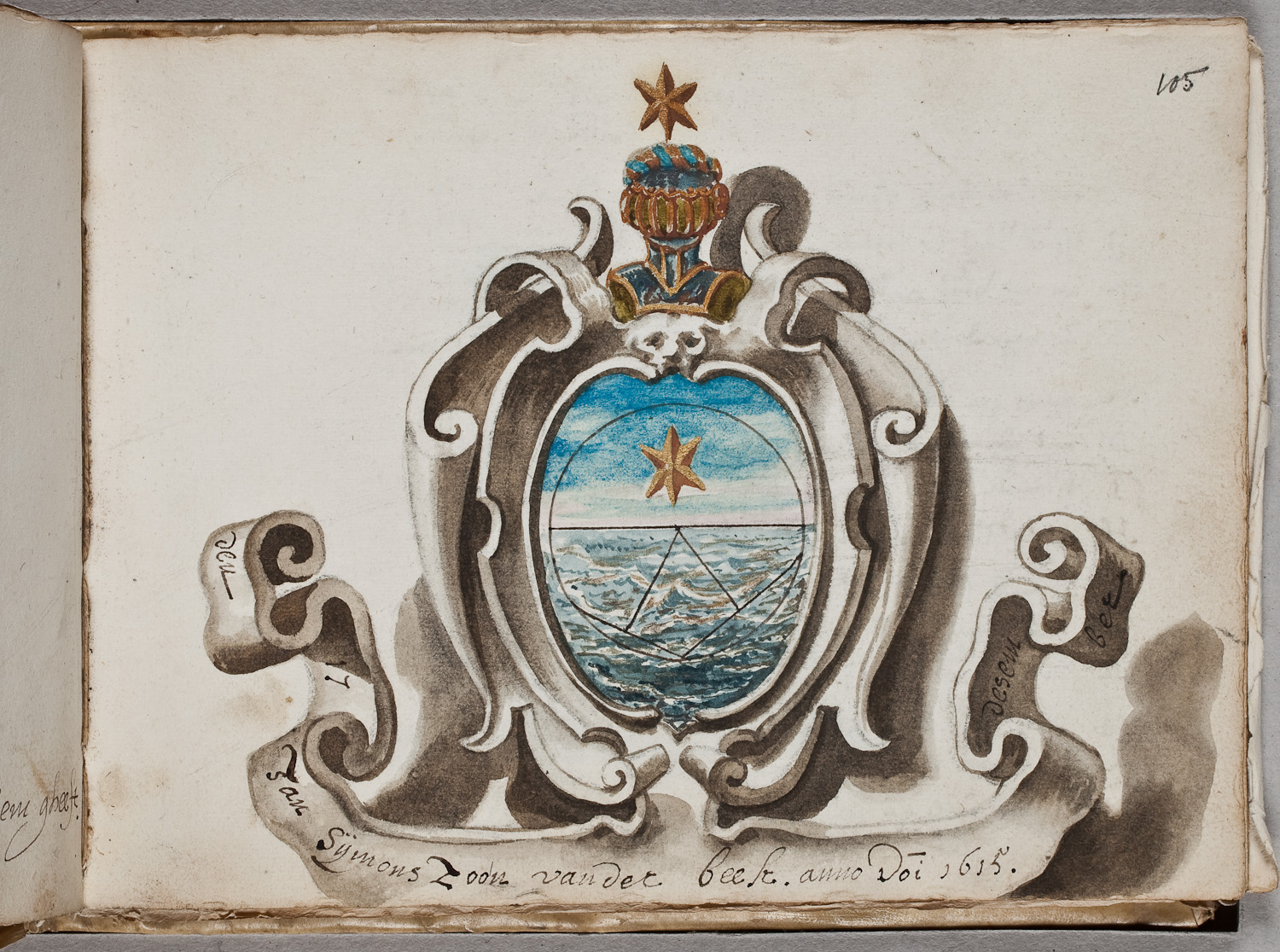
Watercolor by Torrentius in the album amicorum of Thibault, incl. the six-point star from the coat of arms of the Thibault family

Details about Thibault's life are sparse, derived from his book and his album amicorum. The latter contains handwritten notes and celebratory poems from Thibault's friends, relatives, pupils, and colleagues, included among whom are several contemporary fencing masters.

Thibault was born in or around 1574 in Antwerp, son of Hendrick Thibaut and Margaretha van Nispen. Although his father used the surname "Thibaut," Gérard used the French form "Thibault." Hendrick Thibaut came from a well-known family in Ypres, living in Ghent and Antwerp before going into exile in the northern Netherlands. Hendrick's eldest son, Christiaen, founded the noble family Thibaut van Aegtekerke.

Thibault first studied swordsmanship in Antwerp under Lambert van Someren, who taught between the years of 1564 and 1584. In 1605, Thibault was a wool merchant in Sanlúcar de Barrameda, south of Seville on the Guadalquivir river, and the hometown of Jerónimo Sánchez de Carranza. There, he took an interest in swordsmanship, studying the Spanish rapier system of Destreza.

Thibault left Spain to return to the Netherlands, and was in Amsterdam as early as 1610. In or around 1611, he presented his system to an assembly of Dutch masters at a competition in Rotterdam. Thibault won first prize, earning an invitation to the court of Prince Maurice of Nassau, where the Prince observed Thibault's system in a multi-day demonstration.

Although initially met with skepticism, Thibault convinced his fellow Dutch fencing masters, including Johannes Damius of Haarlem, Dirck van Stervergen of Leiden, Cornelis Cornelisz van Heusden of Amsterdam, and Thibault's former teacher Lambert von Someron. In 1615, Thibault was invited to the court at Cleves and left Amsterdam, where he once again demonstrated his system successfully. Over the next several years, Thibault traveled from Cleves, Amsterdam, to Spain, back to Amsterdam, and finally to Leiden in 1622. There, Thibault studied mathematics at Leiden University. It is unclear whether Thibault taught his system at the university. It is during his time in Leiden that Thibault likely began working on Academie de l'Espée and employed a team of sixteen master engravers.

== Academie de l'Espée ==
Thibault's only known work was a rapier manual whose full title can be translated as Academy of the Sword: wherein is demonstrated by mathematical rules on the foundation of a mysterious circle the theory and practice of the true and heretofore unknown secrets of handling arms on foot and horseback. Despite its frontispiece, which lists the year 1628, the manual was not published until 1630, a year after Thibault's death. Thibault was Dutch, but because Academie de l'Espée was written in French and describes a variant on the Spanish school of swordsmanship, it has often been mistaken as an alternately French or Spanish work.

Academie de l'Espée is widely considered to be the most lavishly illustrated swordsmanship manual ever produced. A team of master engravers were employed to produce plates for all forty-four chapters of the treatise, containing about twelve to fifteen pairs of swordsmen per instructional plate. These plates contain a wide variety of intricate backgrounds and costumes which appear to be purely decorative. The controversial 19th century fencing historian Egerton Castle described Academie de l'Espée as "without exception, the most elaborate treatise on swordsmanship, and probably one of the most marvellous printed works extant, from a typographic and artistic point of view" yet simultaneously dismissed the manual as nothing more than a "bibliographic curiosity."

Academie de l'Espée was translated into English by John Michael Greer and first published by The Chivalry Bookshelf in 2006. A reprint from Aeon Books became available in 2017. It has also been translated into Russian.

=== The Mysterious Circle ===
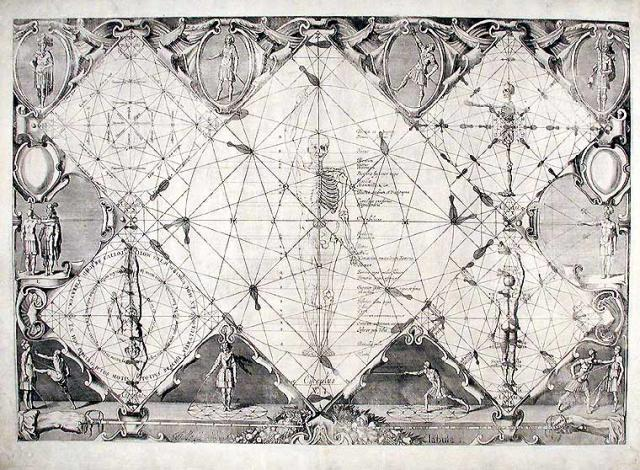
Several versions of Thibault's "mysterious circle" from chapter 1 of Academie de l'Espée.

Thibault's treatise is notable for its highly logical, mathematical approach to swordplay. He discusses at great length the precise geometric relationships between opposing fighters, always stressing the importance of natural proportion. These relationships are expressed through a circular diagram that Thibault refers to as the "mysterious circle," visible on the floor in most of the plates in Academie de l'Espée.

Every element of the circle is proportional to the fighter's body. For example, if the fighter were to stand with their feet together and arm extended (but not locked) straight upward, pointing their index finger, then the diameter of the circle would be equal to their height as measured from the soles of their feet to their extended finger. The ideal blade length should not exceed 1/2 of this length, or the radius of the circle. All measurements in Thibault's system are expressed in this diagram.

The circle is not only used to determine the proper length of one's swords, steps, and distance, but also as a teaching aid to express in precise terms how and where to step in relation to the opponent in order to produce the desired effect. This allows for a kind of geometric shorthand, whereby Thibault can simply refer to a location by the nearest intersection in the diagram. Because of its use as a stepping guide, Thibault details how to draw such a proportional circle on the ground for the reader's own use with nothing other than basic tools.

=== The sword ===
Thibault's preferred weapon is the rapier, and he describes its use against a multitude of opposing weapons such as rapier and dagger, longsword, and even early firearms. Although many of his contemporaries provided instruction in the use of offhand weapons, Thibault only gave instruction in the use of a single weapon, believing it capable of defeating all other weapons and weapon combinations.

Thibault writes at length about the optimum length of a sword, concluding that its blade must not exceed the height of the fighter's navel when standing naturally. This blade length also corresponds exactly to the radius of Thibault's circle. This maximum length is contrasted with the long blades that had become fashionable in Thibault's time. He does not provide a minimum length.

==== The guard ====
Despite the popularity of increasingly complex hilts, Thibault's ideal hilt is relatively simple. It features straight quillons as well as finger rings and side rings with little else. Thibault gives proportional measurements for the various components of the hilt, each based on his circle diagram. These measurements dictate that the sword's quillons are to equal the length of one's foot, the combined length of pommel and grip should equal exactly twice the length of the guard from the quillons forward, and so on.

==== Gripping the sword ====
Thibault describes a unique method of gripping the sword which allows for many of his other techniques. Whereas Thibault's contemporaries tended to grasp a sword with one or two fingers wrapped around the fore quillon, inside the finger ring aligned with the sword's true edge, Thibault's grip involves resting the ricasso on the index finger, with the tip of the thumb resting on the rear quillon. The blade is thus aligned horizontally when the arm is extended. Thibault's system does not rely entirely upon this grip, sometimes dropping the thumb beneath the quillon with the index finger wrapped around the fore quillon. Thibault uses this grip for cutting and for defending at close range. This latter curved or bent arm grip is similar, if not identical, to the grip for which most of Thibault's contemporaries advocated.

=== The posture of the straight line ===
Thibault's primary stance is an upright posture which allows for fluid, graceful motion while remaining profiled to the opponent. He argues that it is a "natural" stance, similar to an ordinary posture while standing or walking. It involves holding the feet several inches apart, at an angle of roughly 45 degrees. Thibault describes the placement of the feet in relation to the diameter line of his "mysterious circle". The fighter's back foot is perpendicular to this line, while their front foot is angled inward, with the weight distributed evenly on the balls of the feet. Both shoulders are held in alignment and fully profiled to the opponent. The sword arm, normally extended but not locked, is also in alignment with the shoulders. The rear arm remains largely unused in order to maintain this profile, with the rear arm extended and the hand pointing downward and back.

=== Subjection ===
Thibault advocates a subjection to either the inside or outside of the arm when facing an opponent who uses his posture. Subjection is executed by first bringing the blades into contact, then increasing the angle of the sword to achieve greater leverage than the opponent’s, sweeping or pushing it aside, then advancing at an angle, keeping the opponent’s sword dominated (subjected) by this superior angle.

In the case of the inside line, the primary target becomes the opponent's flank and the attack presses the opponent's blade downward and to their own outside line. On the outside line, the primary target becomes the opponent's head, pressing his blade outwards during the attack. How the opponent responds to this is then gauged by sensitivity. Thibault identifies several different pressures of sentiment and the correct way to enter against them.

== See also ==
- Destreza

== Sources ==
- Thibault, Gérard. Academy of the Sword, trans. John Michael Greer (Highland Park, TX: The Chivalry Bookshelf, 2006)
- de la Fontaine Verwey, Herman. "Gerard Thibault and his Academie de l'espée," Quaerendo VIII (1978) pp. 284–319
- Castle, Egerton. Schools and masters of fence from the Middle Ages to the eighteenth century. (1885) p. 122.
- "Академия меча" Жерар Тибо Т 39 — Днепр: Середняк Т. К., 2017, — 536 с. ISBN 978-617-7479-75-7
