= Salvator Fabris =

Italian fencer

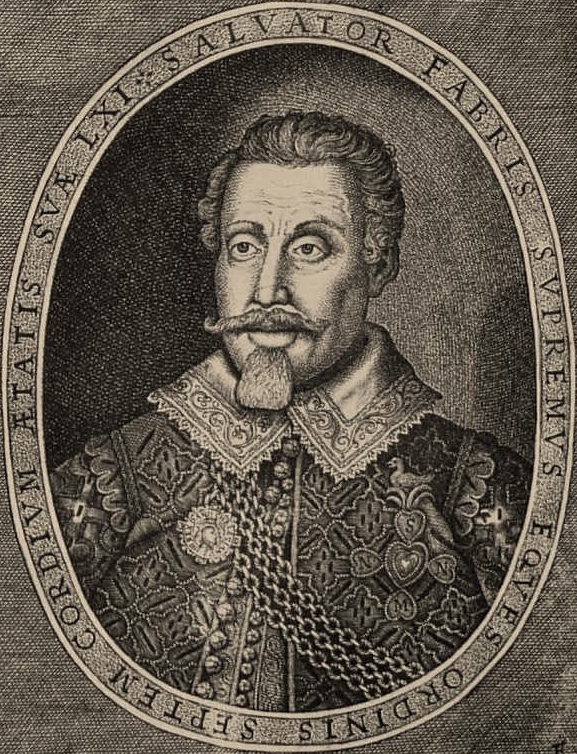
- Salvator Fabris
- Born: ca. 1544; Padua, Italy
- Died: November 11, 1618; Padua, Italy; Malignant Fever
- Other names: Salvatore Fabris, Salvador Fabbri
- Style: Italian Swordsmanship
- Teacher: Unknown

Salvator Fabris (1544–1618) was an Italian fencing master from Padua. During his life he taught in various European countries, most notably in Denmark where he was the fencing instructor of King Christian IV. It was during his time in Copenhagen that he published his treatise on rapier fencing, Lo Schermo, overo Scienza d’Arme, in 1606. The treatise became a fencing bestseller around Europe, and was reprinted until 1713 and translated into several languages, notably into German, and again in 2005, into English.

His treatise, first published by Henrico Waltkirch, is also regarded as one of the finest examples of baroque printing, with its 191 copperplate engravings by Jan van Haelbeck, Francesco Valeggio and possibly other artists. This book is also important to bibliophiles because it is the first Danish book to feature copperplate engravings.

Fabris was also the Supreme Knight of the Order of the Seven Hearts, a chivalrous order of which we do not yet know much today. The order's insignia, consisting of seven hearts arranged in a cross pattern surmounted by a phoenix bird, are visible on the left breast of Fabris' only extant portrait (see illustration). The wording "Supreme Knight of the Order of the Seven Hearts" is coupled with the author's name in all editions of Fabris' work, indicating that it must have been a point of importance.

== Life ==
Salvator Fabris was born in 1544 in or around Padua, and his youth coincided with the flowering of the Italian school of swordsmanship, with early Italian masters like Achille Marozzo, Angelo Viggiani and Giacomo di Grassi still teaching. Although it is not known from whom he learned fencing, his statement of "having had considerable experience" may suggest his having studied under more than one master.

He worked as a fencing master in Italy as well as in Northern Europe. The French master Henry de Sainct-Didier in 1573 mentions a meeting with a young fencer by the name of "Fabrice" while he was in the process of writing his own treatise, though there is nothing to prove that Fabris and Fabrice are the same man. But we are on sure footing when we find Fabris in the service in Johan Frederik of Schleswig-Holstein-Gottorp, archbishop of Bremen and cousin to the King of Denmark, in the 1590s.

It was during his years with the Archbishop that Fabris composed his treatise Scienza e Prattica d'Arme (of knowledge and practice of arms), although the book would be first published under the title Lo Schermo, overo Scienza D'Arme (on fencing, or martial knowledge). The book was first presented to the Archbishop in handwritten form, with drawings of fencing positions and actions. This precious manuscript now resides at the Library of Copenhagen.

After employment with the Archbishop, Salvator entered the service of the king of Denmark, Christian IV from 1601 to 1606. It was the King himself who sponsored the publication of the treatise, putting his Flemish court artist, Jan van Haelbeck, as well as others like Valeggio (whose signature also appears in the book's plates) at Fabris' disposal to refine the drawings of the book's handwritten edition.

Fabris left the King's employment in 1606, and after traveling across Europe, returned to Italy, teaching at the University of Padua. His renown at its peak, young noblemen from all over Europe came to Padua to be taught by him. He died in 1618 after fighting against malignant fever for about 10 days. He was 74. According to Hynitzsch, the editor of the 1676 German-Italian parallel edition of Fabris' treatise, on his deathbed, he bestowed his salle to senior student Herman, a German, who was later assassinated by a jealous colleague by the name of Heinrich.

Jacopo Gelli, a 19th-century fencing historian, states that a monument was erected in honor of the Master in his native town. This monument was shown by Hynitzsch in 1676 as being under construction. Modern Fabris researchers have so far been unable to find other references to it.

== Fabris' Fencing Treatise: the Scienza D'Arme ==
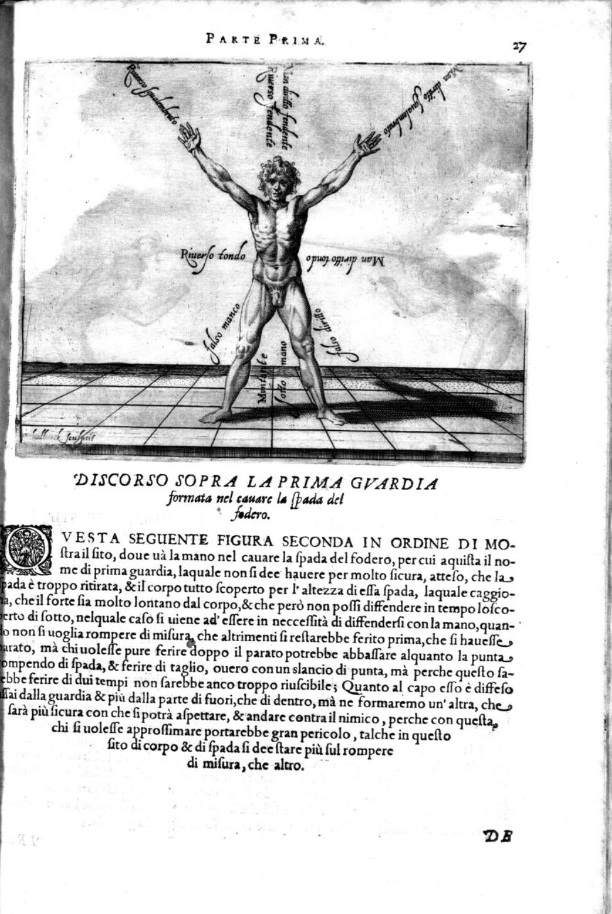
Page from De lo Schermo overo Scienza d'Arme, engraving by Jan van Haelbeck

In his treatise, Lo Schermo, overo Scienza D'Arme (1606) Fabris deals with sword alone, sword and dagger, sword and cape as well as bare-handed fighting against a man armed with a dagger. Fabris also includes a Book II consisting on ways to defeat an opponent without stopping in guard, a unique occurrence among 17th-century Italian extant fencing treatises.

In raw number of pages and illustrations, Fabris is the 17th century fencing master who, after thoroughly describing the use of the single sword, devotes the longest sections to sword and dagger and sword and cape.

The Scienza D'Arme is structured as follows:

BOOK I

Sword Alone

- Fencing theory: dealing with the four guards, the sword and its parts, how to close the line, thrusting and cutting attacks, defences, voiding actions, engagements and disengagements, feints, invitations, measure, tempo and contratempo, arm and body posture.
- Fencing tactics: dealing with how a tall man should face a short man and vice versa, or a strong a weak, or a cool-tempered a rash one.
- Illustrations of the main guards, the main invitations, the thrusts and the voids.
- Illustrations of the main actions using the theory presented before: progressive instruction starting on how to take the tempo, going through how to parry and riposte in a single motion, touching on the four hand-parries and the voids, and ending on how to defeat these.

Sword and Dagger

- Theory on the use of the sword and dagger (building on sword alone): how to properly close the line, how to engage the opponent's weapon, how to deal with opponents who stand in guard with a different foot forward, how to practice parrying with the dagger.
- Illustrations of the main guards of sword and dagger, the main invitations, the thrusts and the voids.
- Illustrations of the main actions using the sword and dagger, in a similar progression as that presented in the theory section.

Sword and Cape

- Theory on the use of the sword and cape: how to hold the cape, what the cape's strengths and weaknesses are, how to parry, etc.
- Illustrations of the main guards of sword and cape, the main invitations, the thrusts, the defenses and the voids.
- Illustrations of the main actions using the sword and cape, in a similar progression as that presented in the theory section.

BOOK II

On Proceeding Against the Opponent Without Stopping in Guard

- Theory and benefits.

Part 1: Sword Alone

- Six techniques on how to proceed against the opponent without stopping in guard with sword alone. Each technique consists of a theory section followed by the depiction of a body-posture to be used in the technique, and ending with illustrations of the most likely actions.

Part 2: Sword and Dagger

- Four techniques on how to proceed against the opponent without stopping in guard with the sword and dagger. Here, Fabris follows the same template as for the sword alone above. The section ends in the depiction of an opponent receiving a simultaneous thrust from his adversary's sword and dagger.

Grapples, Disarms and Cape Throws Fabris adds a section on these techniques.

Part 3: How To Use a Dagger and How to Defeat a Dagger-Wielding Assailant while Bare-Handed Fabris states that he had included this brief compendium only at the request of some friends. Here, he gives some advice on how to adapt his fencing theory to the use of a single dagger, and he then shows several ways in which to disarm a dagger-wielding assailant while bare-handed. The section ends on the depiction of a swordsman against a half-pikeman, and with the assurance that "if you have understood the theory, you will figure out how to proceed even against the man armed with the polearm."

== What other 17th century fencing masters said of Fabris ==
Throughout the 17th century, other masters such as Francesco Alfieri (1640), Giuseppe Morsicato Pallavicini (1670) and Francesco Antonio Marcelli (1686) commented on Fabris being a "great master" and "a man of the greatest name in our profession" and the author who best described the use of the guards.

In his celebrated 1630 L'Academie De L'Espee, The Flemish master Girard Thibault added a chapter commenting on the excellence of Fabris' students, praising the quickness of their feints and suggesting ways to defeat them.

But it is the German author Hynitzsch who in 1676 gives us the fullest idea of the fame that Fabris had achieved in Europe: his book was plagiarized by other fencing masters (Hynitczch accuses the Venetian Nicoletto Giganti in particular), while his style was adopted by several official fencing institutions such as the University of Jena.

== Anecdotes on Fabris ==
The legendary stature achieved by Fabris in his lifetime accounts for the many anecdotes about him still circulating today.

According to Italian fencing master and historian Luigi Barbasetti, Fabris was summoned to England to help Shakespeare choreograph the sword actions in the premier of Hamlet.

There is also an interesting, yet uncorroborated story about a Salvator Fabritz (sic) coming to Sweden in 1594 as an assassin hired by king Sigismund III Vasa, according to the Exegesis historica, written by Duke Charles and his Chancellor Nicolaus Chesnecopherus and printed in Stockholm in 1610 based on a Swedish version published in 1609. According to this account, Sigismund intended to assassinate his uncle Charles, during a banquet at Uppsala on February 12, following the royal funeral of John III on 1 February. After the meal a number of costumed Italians, including an actor and playwright by the name of Salvator Fabritz, took part in a stage-performance with drawn swords. Fabritz was supposed to kill Charles during the performance, but Charles had been warned by a certain Hieronymus Strozzi and stayed away from the banquet. However, given that Fabris is a very common Italian surname (akin to Smith in English), it seems highly unlikely that these are both the same person. Also, there is no record of the Master ever being in Sweden.

In 1676, Hynitzsch states that Nicoletto Giganti plagiarized Fabris' Book II in a German and French parallel edition in 1624. The German translator of Fabris is so incensed that he likens Giganti's offence to "the kidnapping of a child", and wishes for the immediate recall of the work.

Today, Fabris' style is one of the most studied in the revival of historical European martial arts.

This master's name and last name are found (historically) in different spellings such as Salvator, Salvatore, Salvador and Fabris, Fabbri plus other non-Italian spellings.

== Editions ==
- 1606 De lo schermo overo scienza d’arme di Salvator Fabris Capo dell’ordine dei sette cori
- 1615, German translation, New Künstlich Fechtbuch: darinnen etliche vorneme Kunststück dess weitberümbten Fecht: und Lehrmeisters Sig. Salvator Fabri da Padoa
- 1615, German translation, Neu künstlich Fechtbuch Darinen 500 Stück im ainfachen Rapier, wie auch ettliche im Rapier und Dolch dess witberümberten Fecht und Lehrmeisters Sig. Salvator Fabri da Padoa
- 1617, German translation, Neu künstliches Fechtbuch darinen etliche hunder Stück im einfachen wie auch in Dolchen und Rappier auß dem Fundament der Fechtkunst
- 1619, German translation, Des Kunstreichen Italiänische Fechtkunst. Das ist: gründeliche und außfürliche Unterrichtung von dem Fechten
- 1624 Della vera pratica et scienza d’armi, libri due, pera di Salvatore Fabris
- 1676 Italian-German parallel text edition, without sword and dagger and sword and cape, with ample preface by Hynitzsch.
- 1677 Sienza e pratica d’arme
- 1713, German translation, Scienza e practica d'armed'arme di Salvatore Fabris. Das ist: Herrn Salvatore Fabris Italiänische Fecht Kunst, zu welchen noch kommen ist das dritte Buch welches einen Tractat vom Ringen, dessgleichen, wie man sich mit blossen Fäusten wider einen beschirmen solle, in sich hält, in das Teutsche übersetzet und heraus gegeben von Johann Joachim Hynitzschen
- 2005, Tommaso Leoni (trans.), Art of Dueling: Salvator Fabris' Rapier Fencing Treatise of 1606, Highland Village, TX: The Chivalry Bookshelf (2005), ISBN 1-891448-23-4. Complete English translation with illustrations. Out of print, but reprint of the illustrated translation (without Leoni's introduction) available through Lulu.com

== See also ==
- Historical European Martial Arts
- Italian school of swordsmanship
- Rapier
- Ridolfo Capo Ferro
