= Jerónimo Sánchez de Carranza =

Spanish humanist and fencers fencing master

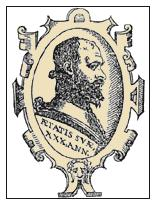
- Born: c. 1539; Seville
- Died: c. 1606; Honduras
- Occupations: Lawyer and swordsmen, later Governor of Hondurad
- Writing career
- Notable works: Precursor of the Spanish school of fencing, destreza

Don Jerónimo Sánchez de Carranza, (Spanish: Jerónimo Sánchez de Carranza), Jerónimo de Carranza, Portuguese: Hieronimo de Carança; c. 1539 – c. 1600 or 1608) was a Spanish nobleman, humanist, scientist, one of the most famous fencers, and a precursor of the later Spanish school of fencing, destreza. He was the author of the treatise on fencing De la Filosofía de las Armas y de su Destreza y la Aggression y Defensa Cristiana ('The Philosophy of Arms') from 1569, published in 1582. Carranza created the ideal of a poet and a warrior, which became the main guide to life for noblemen.

Jerónimo de Carranza, as the precursor of destreza, is also called "the pioneer of the science of handling weapons." His ideas were probably picked up by Luis Pacheco de Narváez, who later founded the Spanish fencing style "Verdadera Destreza", which lasted almost 300 years.

== Biography ==
Hidalgo Jerónimo Sánchez de Carranza was born in Seville around 1539 and educated at the universities of Seville and Salamanca.

In the early 1560s he arrived in the city of Sanlúcar de Barrameda where he entered the service of Alonso Pérez de Guzmán and de Zúñiga Sotomayor, the 7th Duke of Medina Sidonia. Together with the duke, he participated in the invasion of the Algarve, part of the military campaign that eventually led Philip II of Spain to the Portuguese throne. For his services to the Spanish crown, Carranza became a knight, and then was appointed commander of the Order of the Image of Christ.

During this period of his life de Carranza wrote his famous treatise De la Filosofía de las Armas y de su Destreza y la Aggression y Defensa Cristiana ('The Philosophy of Arms').

In 1584 he moved to Madrid, where he worked as a judge. Five years later he was appointed governor of the province of Honduras. In Honduras, he faced the treasurer Gregorio Santiago and Gaspar de Andrada, the bishop of Comayagua, who later was accused of corruption. In 1595, he defeated a group of French privateers who landed near Puerto Caballos. At the end of his term as governor in 1596, he moved to the city of Santiago de Guatemala, where he took the vacant position of jurist.

He likely died in Guatemala circa 1608.

== Family ==
He had several children with Catalina Perez de Aguilar from Sanlúcar but never married. Two of his sons went with him to Honduras: the eldest son Gil Sanchez de Carranza, who died returning from the Philippines in 1606, and Geronimo Sancho de Carranza.

== The Philosophy of Arms ==
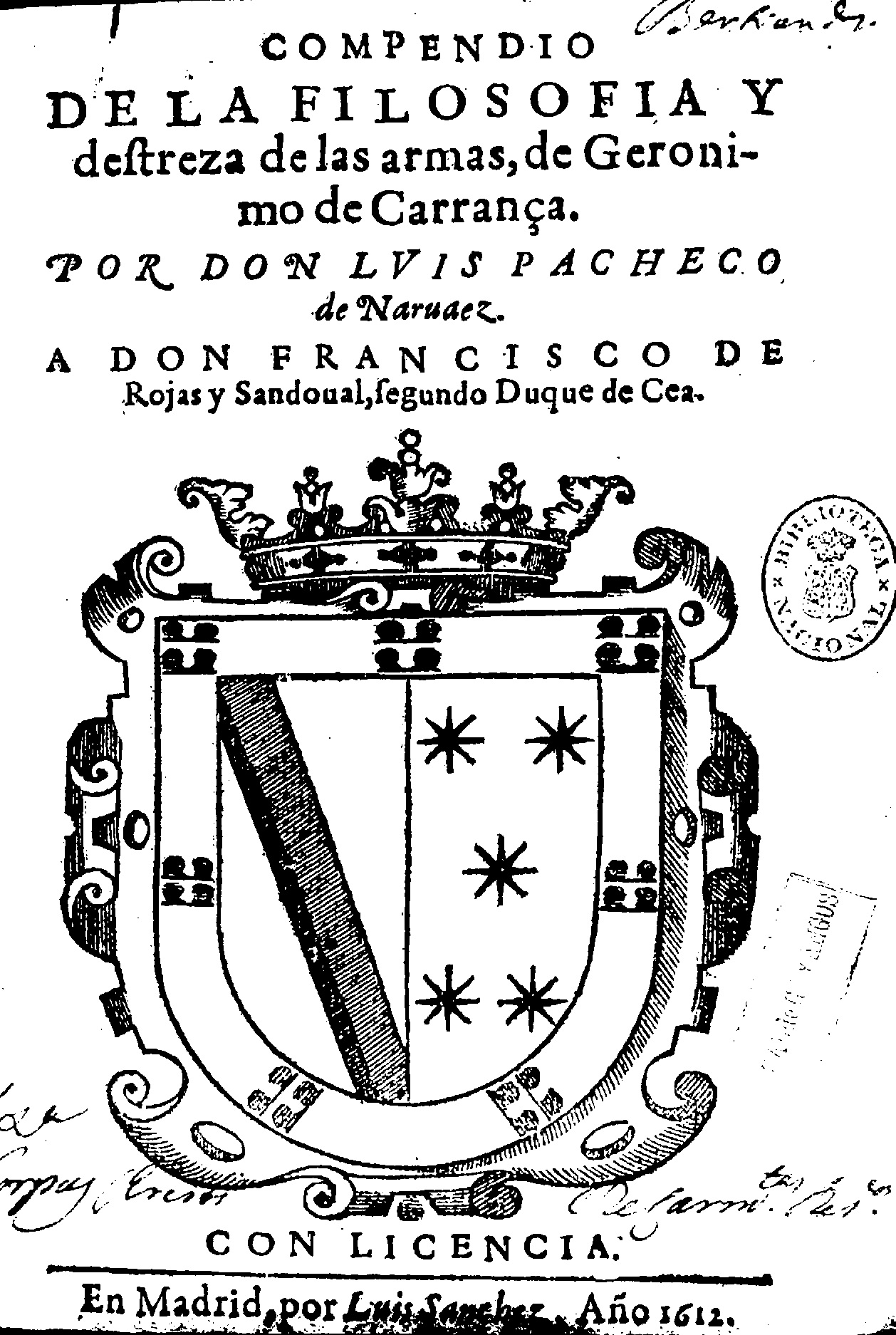
A Treatise on "The Philosophy of Arms", Jerónimo de Carranza ("Compendio de la filosofia de las armas de Geronimo de Carrança")

Sánchez de Carranza wrote his treatise De la Filosofía de las Armas ('The Philosophy of Arms'), during the service at the court of the Duke of Medina Sidonia. The only publication of the book took place in 1582 in Sanlúcar de Barrameda, where the court of the Dukes of Medina Sidonia was located. The work is a humanistic dialogue dedicated to the presentation of the new art of fencing. The philosophy of weapons and the art of fencing is precisely the title the author gave to his work because he does not simply describe the new system of fencing, but does so with an emphasis on philosophy (the treatise is written with references to Plato, Aristotle, Llull, Ficino, and others). In his treatise Carranza also touches on medicine, mathematics, geometry, ethics, and created the concept of philosophical fencing esgrima filosófica, or combat philosophy, unique in European martial arts history.

Participants in the dialogue, following Plato and his Renaissance followers, including Castiglione, also borrowed a number of dialogues. There are four in the treatise, where conversations are held about the true art of fencing. The fictitious names of the interlocutors are Carranza himself, the poet Fernando de Herrera, the humanist Juan de Mal Lara and the doctor Pedro de Peramato (their names were given in his account of Carranza's science by his disciple and follower Luis Pacheco de Narváez, 1600).

To my great regret, the knights, whose main distinction should be a mighty spirit, now more and more resemble women or, better said, dressed up in substances that are neither suitable for peacetime support nor for defense in times of war; and it even seems that some of them were born only to represent in comedy dressed up silent figures ...

— Jerónimo Sánchez de Carranza, The Philosophy of Arms

Sánchez de Carranza puts a certain medieval meaning into the formation of the ideal of the warrior, the master. The man of letters is a scientist, a knowledgeable, well-read person capable of applying science, describing his sphere of knowledge with the help of an extensive scientific and intellectual apparatus, comparing its scope with that of other sciences, and framing it literarily in an entertaining form. This is undoubtedly consistent not only with the humanistic goals of the era, but with all the desire of Carranza and his readers to build the philosophy and science of the new system of fencing.

As mentioned by D. Gómez Arias de Porres, master of the Spanish school of fencing and follower of Pacheco de Narváez, in his treatise Resumen de la verdadera destreza en el manejo de la espada ('Summary of true swordsmanship skills'):

I would also like to mention my colleague Jerónimo de Carranza, because thanks to his enormous efforts, it was possible to strengthen the strength of the spirit of many men, primarily in the world and in war ...

— Resumen de la verdadera destreza en el manejo de la espada

== Bibliography ==
- (unpublished) Discurso sobre una pregunta que el Duque de Medina Sidonia hizo al Comendador Gerónimo de Carranza sobre la Ley de las injurias. Sanlucar de Barrameda. 1560–1598. pp. 12 h.
- (unpublished) Discurso del comendador Gerónimo de Carranza sobre el honor, dirigido al rey [Felipe II]. Sanlucar de Barrameda. 1560–1598. pp. 9 h.
- Libro de Hieronimo de Carança natural de Sevilla. Que trata de la Philosophia de las Armas. Sanlucar de Barrameda: en casa del mesmo autor. 1582. pp. [34], 9–280, [14] h., [2] en bl., [1] h. de grab.
