= Italian martial arts =

Martial arts popular in Italy

Italian Martial Arts

Italian martial arts include all those unarmed and armed fighting arts popular in Italy between the Bronze Age until the 19th century AD. It involved the usage of weapons (swords, daggers, walking stick and staff). Each weapon is the product of a specific historical era. The swords used in Italian martial arts range from the Bronze daggers of the Nuragic times to the gladius of the Roman legionaries to swords which were developed during the Renaissance, the Baroque era and later. Short blades range from medieval daggers to the liccasapuni Sicilian duelling knife.

== Characteristics of Italian combat styles ==
The base of most Italian Systems is fencing and many methods of stick fighting use the same techniques and movements used when fencing with swords. Therefore, if a practitioner trains with the stick or baton, he would also become proficient with the sword. Examples of this are Canne Italiana which uses the moves and techniques of the duelling sabre (sciabola da terreno) and Bastone Italiano, where the moves comes from fencing with the two-handed sword (Spadone a Due Mani).

The main historical periods that influenced the development of Italian weapons were:

== Ancient Rome ==
Gladiatorial Combat was a popular spectator bloodsport in Roman times. Gladiators were trained in special schools and were armed according to the Roman standard or like some of Rome's enemies. This allowed for experimentation with different weapons and styles of combat. Some of the weapons were unusual, such as the net used by the Retiarius.

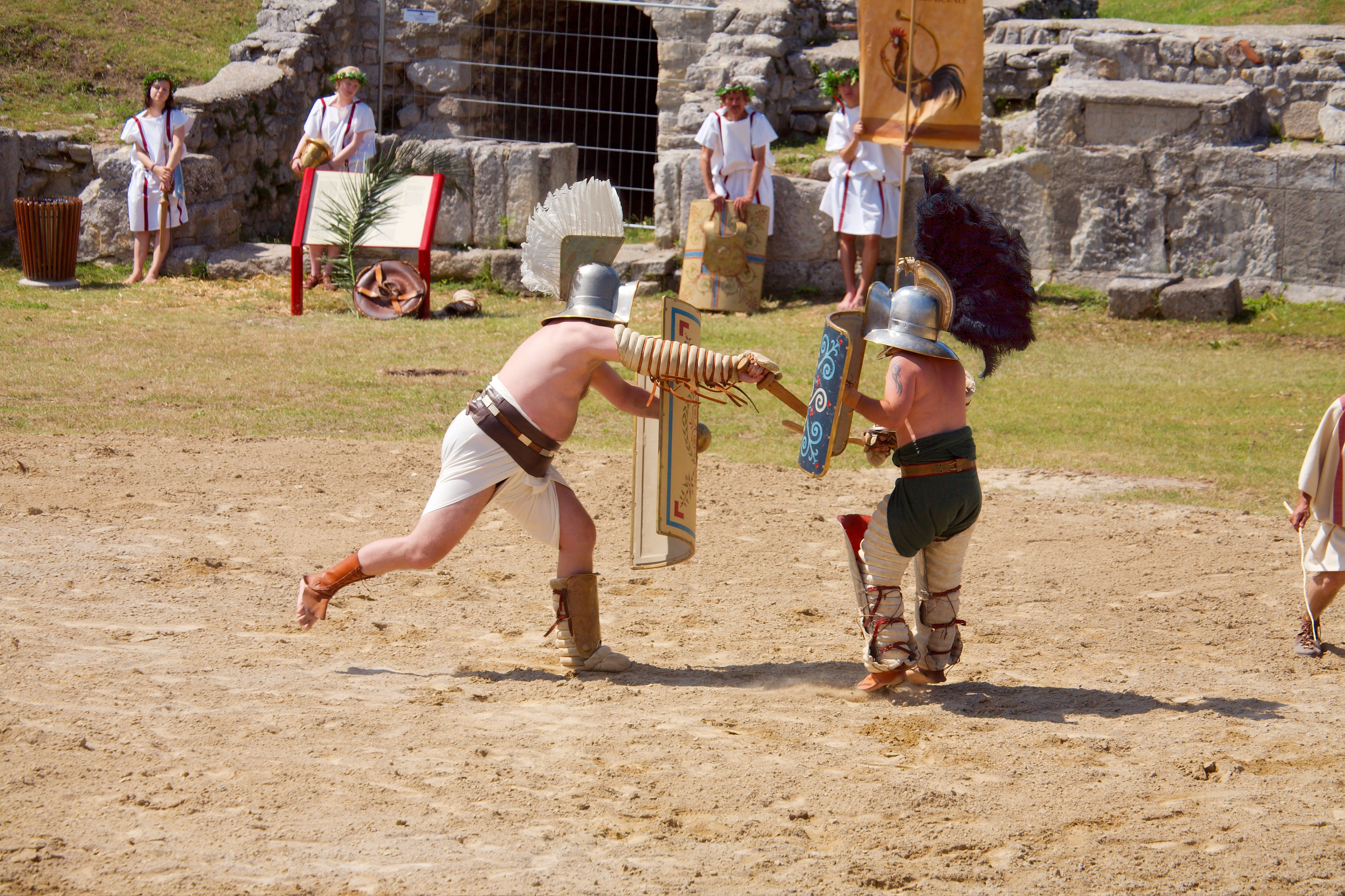
Recreation of a combat between a thraex and murmillo in the Carnuntum Roman ruins.

Roman writers described methods and techniques for training and using the gladius, for example Vegetius in his De Re Militari. Thanks to this wealth of information the art of gladiatorial combat has been resurrected and the discipline of "Gladiatura Moderna" is now being practiced by numerous practitioners.

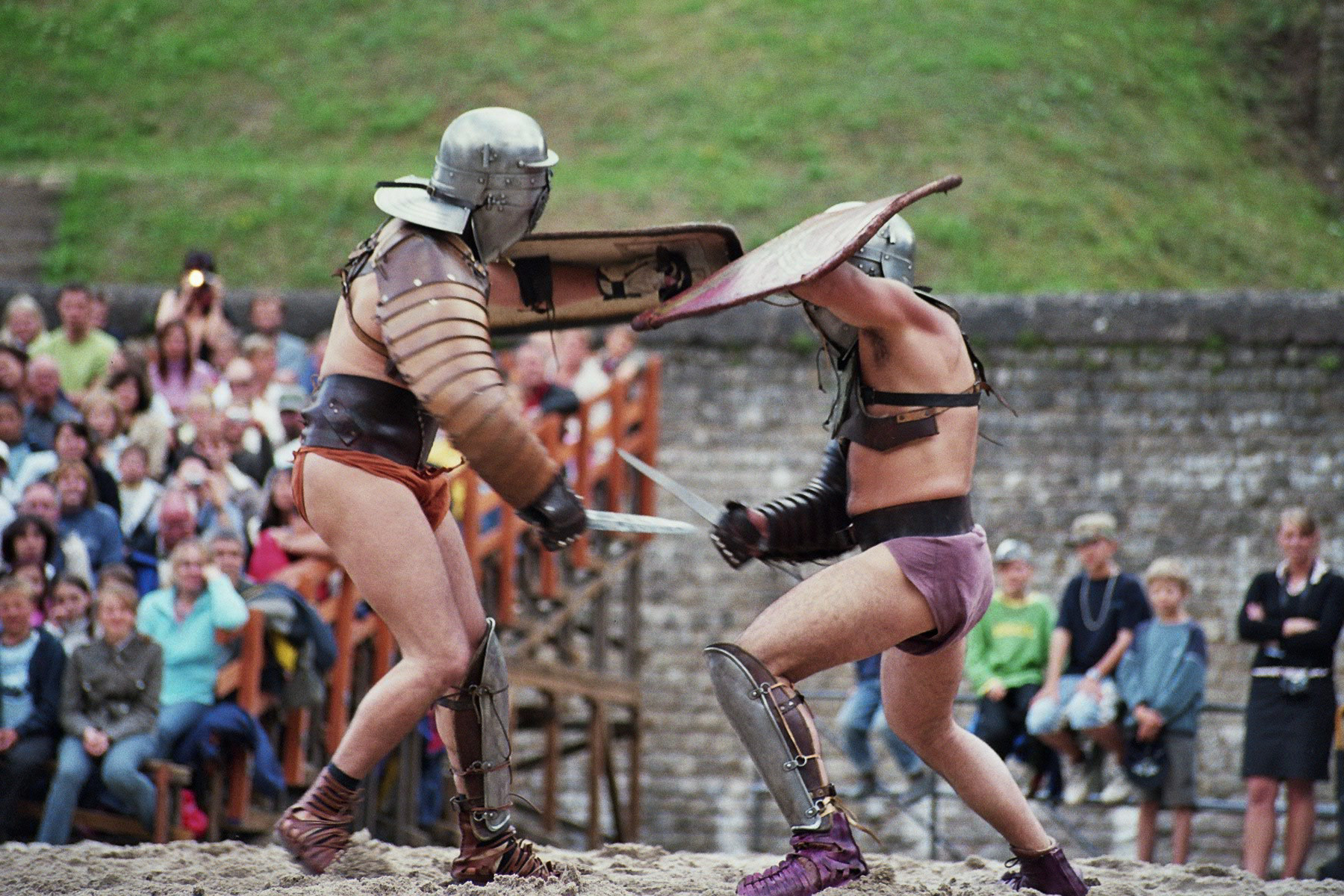
Reconstruction of Gladiatorial combat

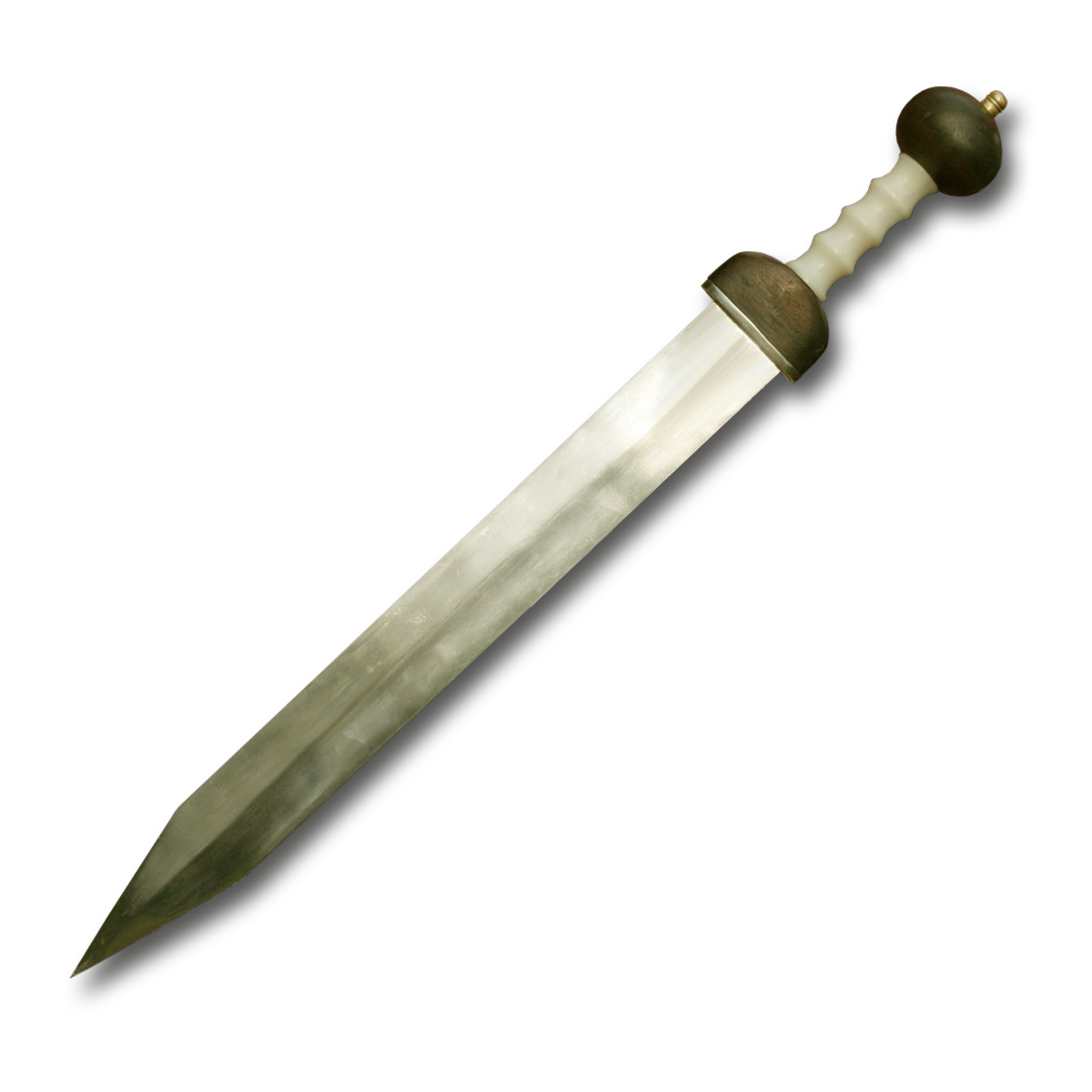
Gladius

== Renaissance and Baroque eras ==
The Renaissance (14th to 17th century AD) saw frequent warfare on Italian soil and mercenary armies were formed by the Condottieri, refining and improving weapons and techniques. One soldier of fortune, Master Fiore dei Liberi wrote a manual Flos Duellatorum or "the Flower of Battle" in 1410, illustrating a repertoire of techniques for many different weapons and for unarmed combat, and thus originated the Italian school of swordsmanship. After Fiore, the Italian school of swordsmanship was continued by Filippo Vadi (1482–1487) and Pietro Monte (1492).

== Battlefield Experience ==
The techniques and skills taught by the Italian school were successfully tested against the Landsknecht and the Swiss Pikemen, regarded as the finest infantries of the time, and also against the French Knights, who represented the flower of European Cavalry. Example of such engagements were:

- The Battle of Arbedo in 1422.
- The battle of Calliano in 1487.
- The Battle of Ravenna in 1512.
- The Challenge of Barletta in 1503. In this tournament 13 Italian knights faced and defeated 13 French knights in hand-to-hand combat.
- The forces led by Giovanni dalle bande nere fighting against the Landsknecht in a number of small battles in 1527.
- The battle of Marignano in which Gian Giacomo Trivulzio earned the rank of Marshal of France, an honor conferred to few foreigners. The utter defeat at Marignano was one of the events that transformed Swiss policy from one of military aggression to one of neutrality.

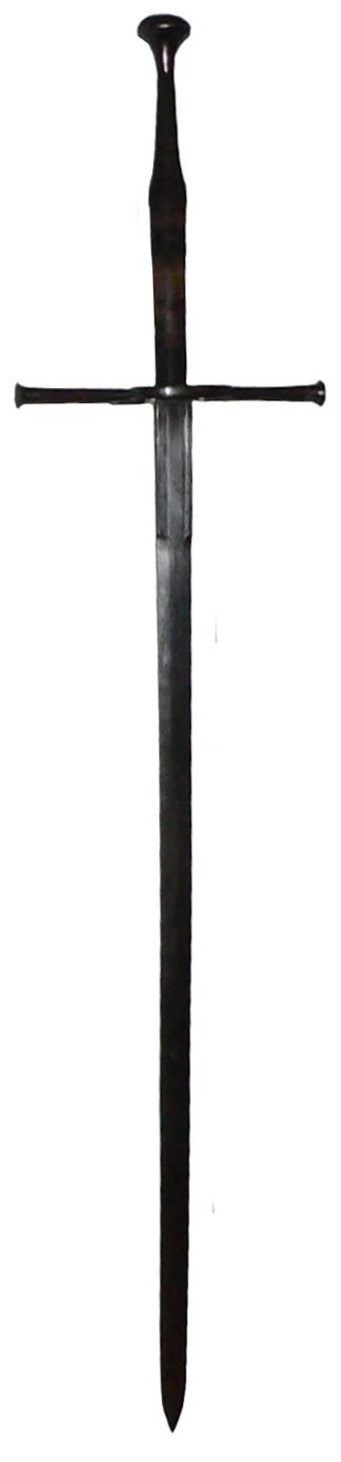
Swiss longsword, 15th or 16th century

These battlefield experiences influence a number of masters at arms, including Antonio Manciolino, Angelo Viggiani, Achille Marozzo, Camillo Agrippa, Giacomo Di Grassi, Giovanni Dall'Agocchie, Henry de Sainct-Didier, Frederico Ghisliero and Vincentio Saviolo

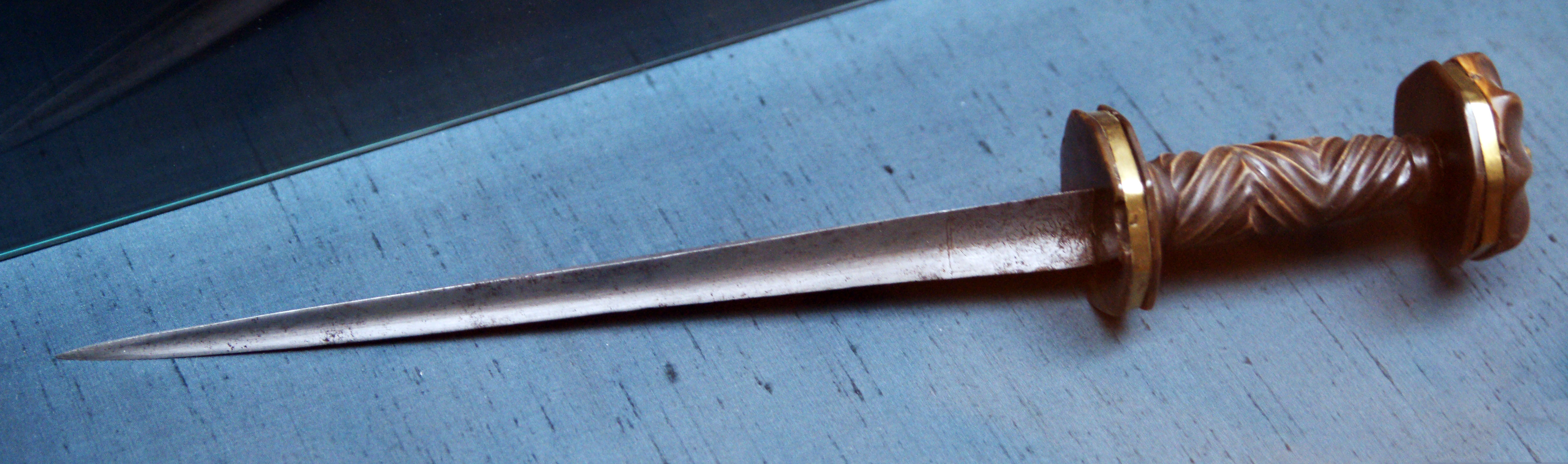
Rondel Dagger

The Thirty Years War

When the era of the Condottieri came to a close on Italian soil, military commanders like Ottavio Piccolomini and Raimondo Montecuccoli placed their soldiers at the disposal of the Austrian Emperor, in a war of religion that devastated Germany and caused the loss of 30% of its people, perhaps the greatest tragedy ever endured by Germany. Italian forces fought valiantly (albeit on the losing side) at the Battle of Lutzen and helped win a great victory at the Battle of Nordlingen in 1634 against the Swedes. Ambrogio Spinola and his men meanwhile helped Spain to conquer the Netherlands in battles like the Siege of Breda. This war was perhaps the last one where swords, daggers and pikes played an important role in battle as firearms technology was now becoming more reliable. Italian swordsmen, armed with short swords and daggers were extremely effective at infiltrating the pike squares of their adversaries and at bringing down the defenseless pikemen armed with the long pikes during the brutal push of the pikes. On the battlefield the so-called "Spada da Lato" or side-sword became the dominant sword type. At the same time in the cities of Italy the sidesword evolved into a new type of sword, used in a civilian setting for duelling. This civilian sword is known as "La Striscia" or Rapier in English. Frenchmen adopted the Italian duelling sword and mastered it, and it is believed that between 1600 AD and 1700 AD well over 70,000 Frenchmen died in duels, many of them mortally wounded by a Rapier. From the late 16th century, Italian rapier fencing attained considerable popularity all over Europe, notably with the treatise by Salvator Fabris whose De lo schermo overo scienza d’arme of 1606 exerted great influence not only in Italy but also in Germany. Fabris was followed by Italian masters such as Nicoletto Giganti (1606), Ridolfo Capo Ferro (1610), Francesco Alfieri (1640), Francesco Antonio Marcelli (1686) and Bondi' di Mazo (1696).

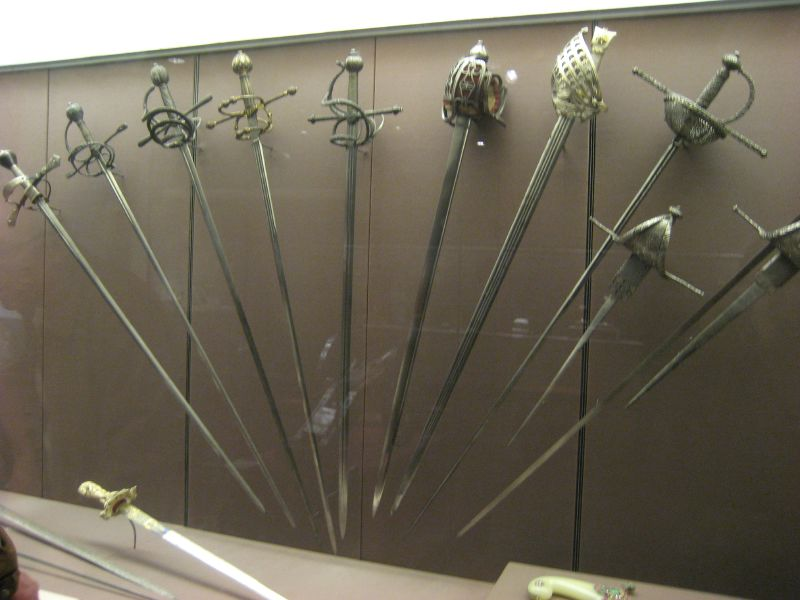
left Different types of Rapiers

== The Napoleonic Wars ==
Napoleon, being himself of Italian origin, added Northern Italy to his domains and was crowned King of Italy using the Iron Crown of Lombardy, a very symbolic gesture since the Bonaparte family had distant Lombard origins. When Napoleon invaded Russia in 1812, he took with him a 50,000-strong Italian contingent. The Italian troops were instrumental in the French victory at the Battle of Maloyaroslavets and were praised by Napoleon. It was during these times that the art of "Scherma da Terreno" (field fencing) was developed, using as weapons swords and sabres. The sabre, in particular, was developed in a dueling art with the school of Sciabola da terreno.

== World Wars ==
World War I During World War I the Italian army created a unit of assault troops called Arditi whose task was to storm German and Austrian Trenches. The main weapon of these soldiers was the dagger and 18,000 arditi were trained and sent to the front. Arditi units won numerous engagements against Austrian and German troops in the final year of World War I, armed with daggers which proved very effective in the confined space of a trench, where rifles were too long to be used in close combat. General Rommel wrote about the exploits of the Arditi in the very last page of his book "Infanterie greift an" (Infantry Attacks). The successful attack on Col Moschin was a perfect example of Arditi tactics.

World War II The second battle of El-Alamein pitted the paratroopers of the Italian 185th Infantry Division "Folgore" with no tanks and only a few antitank guns (whose shells failed to penetrate the armor of British tanks) against one British armored division equipped with 400 heavy tanks. During the first assault 70 British tanks were destroyed by the "Folgore" soldiers, using almost exclusively improvised sticky charges as their anti-tank weapons had proven worthless against British armor. After several days 208 tanks were destroyed in this way. While techniques to destroy armored vehicles are not typically part of martial arts instruction programs, given the exploits of "Folgore", they could be considered a key part of Italian Martial Arts. It does not therefore come as a surprise that the Italian Army has developed a hand-to-hand system known as Metodo di Combattimento Militare and that the 187th Paratroopers Regiment "Folgore" has played a leading role in developing this system.

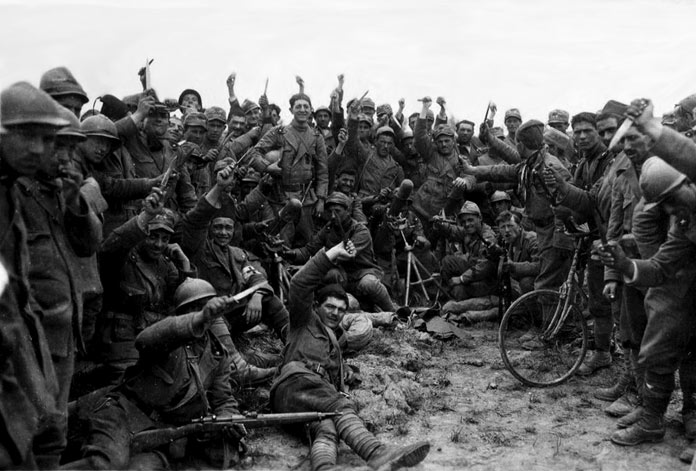
Members of the Arditi corps, 1918; Note the daggers

== Modern Italian Elite Units ==
Several Italian Elite military or police units have developed their own armed and unarmed combat systems. The Navy's Arditi Incursori of COMSUBIN have developed a system, but little information is known about it. From available video footage it appears that it blends techniques from martial arts such as judo, jiu jitsu and kickboxing, resembling "Kick Jitsu" (see later). The Incursori train in full combat gear, including firearms. The Carabinieri elite intervention unit, Gruppo di intervento speciale has also developed an armed/unarmed combat system. From a documentary released on Italian TV it appears that the unit blended techniques from Judo, Karate, Wu-Shu, Savate, Full-contact kickboxing and Muay Thai to create their own system. The GIS operators also adopt a form of Functional training to keep in shape. Perhaps the best known operation involving the use of martial arts is the one carried out in the 1980s by the Nucleo Operativo Centrale di Sicurezza also known as NOCS. It is well known that an operator of NOCS dispatched one of the kidnappers of US general James L. Dozier with a karate chop during the rescue. NOCS is rumored to have had Olympic-level athletes amongst its ranks, particularly in combat sports and weight-lifting. To this day NOCS maintains a working relationship with the Italian federation of Weightlifting. There is no information on what martial arts system is actually used by the NOCS unit, and it is quite possible that this police unit devised its own combat method. Most law enforcements agencies in Italy have adopted a system called Metodo globale di autodifesa or MGA which is a compilation of techniques derived from various martial arts and which has been approved by the Federazione Italiana Judo Lotta Karate Arti Marziali (FIJLKAM).

The evolution of martial arts training in elite units

Elite military and police units tend to integrate firearms (and firearms retention) into their training and techniques so that firearm handling is itself turning into a martial art. After all, if knife and baton are the subject of martial arts training, why not firearms? A new breed of "Master at arms", which were former elite unit operators are providing instruction in firearm handling. This is in keeping with the Italian tradition of the Maestri D'Arme, when former knights and soldiers became weapons instructors in their late years (Fiore dei Liberi da Premariacco is a prime example of this).

== Regional styles and schools ==
=== Apulia ===
The art of Bastone Pugliese has now been codified and is being taught in a school in Manfredonia, in the Puglie region. The first Italian championship of this discipline has been held in 2011. The region is also known for Scherma Di Coltello Pugliese (Apulian Knife) which is further subdivided in three local styles: Taranto, Foggia/Bari and Brindisi/Lecce. One of the most renown experts of this art is Luciano Trimigno, who learned the art from his father and his grandfather who was one of the most renewed knife and stick fighters of the last century. The entire family of Luciano Trimigno (including his father, now in his old age, his cousins and his son Giuseppe) is involved in running his school. Trimigno's students have participated in international tournaments. European championships of knife fencing were held in 2012, 2013 and 2014, with athletes representing various countries, including Italy, Russia and Ukraine. The Italian team was trained by Maestro Trimigno and showcased the skills of Scherma Di Coltello Pugliese. The school of Foggia-Bari originates from ancient chivalry codes based on honor and is enriched in the dueling art.

Another school in Mafredonia, related to the "Cavalieri d'Umilita'" (knights of humility) which is the same tradition as that of Trimigno's family, is the school of Giuseppe Vuovolo. His knife school evolved and differentiated from the original school, and is also based on his personal experience with different Italian masters and experts he met or fought during his younger life in south of Italy. His stick fencing school tradition instead was passed to him by Borgia (still alive) at a young age. He is also an expert in other martial arts, who practices and teaches from the seventies.

Another school of the North of Puglie, in the Ofantina Valley, is the "Cielo e Meraviglia" (Heaven and Marvel) school. This school is not focused on the dueling art but mostly on self-defense, and evolved from the Italian fencing tradition, probably in the 18th century, within the agropastoral environment of the "Masserie", fortified and isolated micro villages within olive tree plantations. In the Masserie, the "Frantoiani" (artisans and producers of olive oil, an expensive and precious product at that time) could not afford to pay private soldiers and warriors, and so they had to develop specific methods with the stick and the knife, their common tools, to survive for defending themselves and the precious olive oil from the continuous attacks of bandits. The recreational or dueling aspects of this school are indeed minimal, due to the hard life, isolation and limited social life that characterized the Masserie. The school is characterized by very short distance and uses not only a sophisticated strategy but also physical strength and dexterity, typical of "Frantoniani" due to their hard job requirements. More diffused in the past, even if secretly kept among masters, the only Masters alive of this art are now Nunizo Galante and Domenico Mancino, who learned it at a young age from Nunzio's grandfather and from several of the other Frantoniani alive, most of them now deceased or very old. Master Mancino defines the School he inherited more like an artisanal art, based on master to student direct teaching and slow learning, rather than a "tradition", transmitted to a larger audience or shared in social events, like it might have happened in schools that were more social or focused on combat and ritual dueling.

In south of Puglie, the "scherma salentina" of the Brindisi/Lecce style, probably one of the oldest, is enriched and bound to the tradition of the "Pizzica", a dance that mimics the knife fencing. This fencing and dancing school is still well alive and practiced. In Torrepaduli during the festivities of San Rocco, this is a traditional and spiritual event where the society around it and many fencing Masters gather together to challenge each other, sometime still to regulate old or new issues. These challenges most of the time are resolved in the "Ronde" (the dancing duels), following a specific hierarchy and code to hide the different Master's secrets and tricks, without the need of dueling with real blades. Some of the known Masters alive are Leonardo Donadei (son of the famous and great fencing Master and Knight Don Raffaele Donadei), Alfredo Barone, Flavio Olivares, Salvatore Barone. Their long term student and delegated to represent the school is Davide Monaco, who runs the school in Lecce.

Another school, located in Presicce-Acquaricca, in the province of Lecce, was run by Master Giuseppe Vittorio Emanuele Massaro (Corchia). (He was also the first to receive the 1st dan black belt in Aiki-jujutsu, according to the style of Master Minoru Mochizuki in Switzerland. https://anamj.ch/) Born into a family of farmers who worked masseries (farms) where tobacco, vines, and frantonia were cultivated, he was trained by his grandfather, Luigi Vito Massaro, who had himself learned scrima from his father, Ippazio Massaro. As mentioned earlier, this style was constantly adapted and refined, primarily through oral transmission and imitation. Knife duels were also common in the region since ancient times. In the masseries, the Frantoiani (olive oil producers, a precious commodity at the time) lacked the resources to hire soldiers and mercenaries. They therefore had to develop specific techniques, using their everyday tools—the stick and knife—to survive and defend themselves, as well as their precious olive oil, against the relentless attacks of bandits. Recreational or dueling aspects of this way of life were minimal, due to the harsh living conditions, isolation, and limited social life that characterized life in the masseries. Consequently, this method was pragmatic and perfectly suited to self-defense. It was characterized by very close-quarters combat and relied not only on sophisticated strategy but also on the physical strength and agility typical of the Frantoiani, necessary to accomplish their demanding task. This style is characterized by the principle of fluid movement and the use of water, lifting the article, handling it naked and combatting it, in particular it involves a sensitive switch "ncuḍḍata" (Incollata) which consists of the maintenance of the contact and the control. dell'avversario, in modo simile al Chi-Sao del Win Tsun o al Tui-Shou del Taiji-Kan. Formerly more widespread, this method is still secretly preserved by certain masters. Today, the legacy of this lineage is carried on by Nevio Massaro, who continues to develop and perfect this style of knife fighting and self-defense.

=== Sicily ===
1) In Sicily an organization called Liu-bo has codified the techniques of traditional Sicilian Staff Fighting known as "Paranza Lunga" and now organizes competitions at the regional level. This school is rapidly expanding. "Paranza Lunga" started around AD 1200 as a method of self-defense for shepherds. The staff was the weapon of the poor, who could not afford a sword. The staff was used in a whirling overhead motion, mimicking the way a knight would use a two-handed sword. Initially there was no established technique and the use of the staff was simply based on the imitation of the use of the sword. By AD 1600, however, separate schools of staff fighting had emerged. A few such schools, or styles, survive to this day. These are "Cavalleresca", "Fiorata", "Battuta", "Ruotata" and "Giocata". "Giocata" is the only style that uses a single hand to operate the staff, while all the other styles use both hands. The staff is about 120 cm long and is made of hard wood, usually from Orange or Pear trees, or from Rosella or Ulivastro trees.

2) Paranza Corta (Sicilian Knife Fighting) is the traditional knife fighting style of Sicily. It is still taught by individual masters but is not organized in a format suitable for divulgation to the masses. Those who wish to learn the art have to seek out the individual masters and be accepted as students. The weapon used is a folding stiletto knife which come in a few variants, the most famous being the Liccasapuni (literally "soap licker" because the blade used to be smeared with soap before a duel, so that it would cause permanent scars on the recipient of a cut). The Sicilian style is further subdivided into two branches: the school of Palermo and that of Catania.

=== Sardinia ===
Istrumpa, the wrestling style of Sardinia is also growing in popularity. The association promoting this sport is participating in European championships for Celtic wrestling stiles (such as Gouren), which has showcased the skills of Istrumpa wrestlers.

=== Genoa ===
In recent years the discipline of Bastone Genovese has begun to be taught in specialized gyms in the region of Liguria, where it had originated centuries ago.

=== Naples ===
Bastone Napoletano is the newest stick fighting discipline to come to the limelight in Italy. Like many other regional styles it has been in existence for centuries but was formerly taught by individual masters on a one on one basis. The discipline is also known as "Varra" and uses a long stick of 1.60 meters.

=== Other regions ===
Several other regional styles of knife and stick fighting remain in existence. These are kept alive by individual Masters at Arms who teach their techniques privately. Amongst the knife styles were the styles of Rome, Neaples, Salerno, Calabria and Corsica (which nowadays is a French region). Disciplines focusing on staff fighting include, Bastone Calabrese (Calabrian Stick Fighting), Bastone Milanese, Bastone Piemontese, Taccaro and Bordone

== Modern Italian styles ==
=== Canne Italiana ===
The Manusardi family from Milan modified, three generations ago, the French art of Canne de combat and created Canne Italiana. According to Italo Manusardi the French style sacrificed power to achieve speed. Canne italiana is slower than the French style but more powerful in its blows. Most moves and techniques are similar to those used in the handling of the dueling sabre (Sciabola da Terreno) hence Canne Italiana represents useful training for those interested in the dueling sabre. The Manusardi gym also teaches "Bastone Italiano" a form of staff fighting similar to Baton francais.

=== Gladiatura Moderna ===
The group "Ars Dimicandi" teaches Gladiatorial combat in the style of ancient Rome. This group has led a meticulous research on gladiatorial combats. Other schools which teach the same art are Scuola Gladiatori Sacrofano and Ludus Magnus.

=== Italian jiu-jitsu, Bianchi Method ===
Gino Bianchi, a savate expert from Genoa, was stationed in Tianjin, China, during World war II as part of an Italian military mission and learnt Jujitsu from Japanese practitioners. Maestro Bianchi eventually returned to Italy and developed a Jiujitsu method using what he had learnt from the Japanese and also by adding techniques that he developed himself. He published a book describing his method, which he said was "adapted for Westerners". This Jujitsu system, known as "Metodo Bianchi" (Bianchi Method) became quite popular in Italy and is still thriving today.

=== Kick Jitsu ===
Kick Jitsu is a modern combat sport, part of the FIKBMS, the Italian federation of kickboxing recognized by CONI. Born in the 1980s through the merger of the techniques and methods of kickboxing and those of jujitsu, the kick jitsu or kickjitsu is regulated in Italy by FIKBMS through a national technical committee that is chaired by Patrizio Rizzoli, who also plays the role of director and national coach. In Italy, the discipline is widespread, especially in Tuscany, Liguria and Calabria. In 2003 the World Kick-Jitsu Federation was founded, which changed its name to World Mixed martial arts Federation in 2012 and which now counts organizations from 20 different countries amongst its members.

=== Nova Scrimia ===
In Italy, UK, USA and Mexico, one of the main organization teaching Italian Martial Arts from the documented period that goes from the 15th century to the 20th century is Nova Scrimia. Nova Scrimia promotes the teaching of the Italian School of Fencing and Swordsmanship, starting as described by Fiore dei Liberi in his 1410 treatise Flos Duellatorum in Armis et sine Armis, also known as "Fior di Battaglia" (The flower of Battle), and followed by the rich and uninterrupted literature of Italian fencing, and by the direct teachings and lineage of the Italian fencing Masters of dueling, self-defense, and sport combat fencing methods and schools (swords, sticks, daggers/knives, unarmed).

The curriculum is divided into modern methods and historical schools, both are studied and practiced for contemporary applications and current use in competitive fighting, dueling and defense. The methods include the use of medieval and renaissance swords, one and half hand sword (spada una mano e mezzo), side sword (spada da lato), the rapier (la striscia), the duelling sabre (spada e sciabola da duello o da terreno), venetian and bolognese dagger styles, short range fencing, different staff and stick fighting methods, Venetian Cornoler stick fighting and hand-to-hand combat (based on grappling and striking methods, ancient boxing and wrestling methods and free hand fencing). All these fencing methods are always characterized to be a "scherma accompagnata", meaning a kind of fencing that always actively uses both hands, with or without a weapon (sword and dagger, two swords, sword and buckler, sword and cape, dagger and cape, two sticks, two daggers, etc.) and in any case it always makes use of the unarmed hand in an active fencing strategy, as if it is a second weapon, a typical characteristic of the Italian school of fencing. All methods, united by the same framework of the art and science of fencing, are practiced for combat and for self-defense.

Nova Scrimia is a research group that started unofficially in 1990 and was founded officially in 1999 in Italy. The founder group (or brotherhood) was enriched over time by experts, professionals and passionate people with different expertise: academic, scientific or historical background and curricula; people who brought and contributed with different Italian fencing traditions, people with solid different martial art curricula. Nova Scrimia Research Group is a collective and collegial work developed to preserve, protect, promote and actualize the Italian Martial Art tradition. Nova Scrimia Italian Martial Art school is based on: preserving the specific fencing principles (like geometry, anatomy and physics); following the science of fencing evolved in Italy and the efficacy of the Art collected and transmitted by the teaching over centuries of experience in duels and battles; maintaining the specific Italian attitude and culture of the dueling and of the fighting that characterize the Art; and finally adapting, at the same time, to the needs, knowledge, culture and technology of the present time.

=== Sistema Scrima ===
Professor G.G. Merendoni has created a style of military combat known as Sistema Scrima (evolved from a prior system called Sistema SAL) inspired by the Arditi of the first world war and incorporating techniques from historical fencing and regional styles. Alpini mountain troops units dispatched to Afghanistan in recent years were trained by the Merendoni school.

== Sources ==
- Grant, Michael (2000). Gladiators. London, United Kingdom: Penguin Books. ISBN 0-14-029934-3.
- Wiedemann, Thomas (1992). Emperors and Gladiators. London, United Kingdom: Routledge. ISBN 0-415-12164-7.
- Wisdom, Stephen; McBride, Angus (2001). Gladiators: 100 BC - AD 200. Oxford, United Kingdom: Osprey Publishing. ISBN 1-84176-299-7.
- Anglo, Sydney. The Martial arts of Renaissance Europe. Yale University Press, 2000. ISBN 0-300-08352-1
- John Clements, Medieval Swordsmanship: Illustrated Methods and Techniques. Paladin Press, 1998). ISBN 1-58160-004-6
- John Clements, Renaissance Swordsmanship : The Illustrated Book Of Rapiers And Cut And Thrust Swords And Their Use. Paladin Press, 1997. ISBN 0-87364-919-2
- John Clements, et al. Masters of Medieval and Renaissance Martial Arts: Rediscovering The Western Combat Heritage. Paladin Press, 2008. ISBN 978-1-58160-668-3
- Gaugler, William. The History of Fencing : Foundations of Modern European Fencing. Laureate Press, 1997. ISBN 1-884528-16-3
- Italian Arditi: Elite Assault Troops 1917–20. Osprey; Paperback; March 2004; 64 pages; ISBN 978-1-84176-686-7
- Arnold, Thomas F. The Renaissance at War. Smithsonian History of Warfare, edited by John Keegan. New York: Smithsonian Books / Collins, 2006. ISBN 0-06-089195-5.
- Baumgartner, Frederic J. Louis XII. New York: St. Martin's Press, 1994. ISBN 0-312-12072-9.
- Black, Jeremy. "Dynasty Forged by Fire." MHQ: The Quarterly Journal of Military History 18, no. 3 (Spring 2006): 34–43. ISSN 1040-5992.
- European Warfare, 1494–1660. Warfare and History, edited by Jeremy Black. London: Routledge, 2002. ISBN 0-415-27532-6.
- Guicciardini, Francesco. The History of Italy. Translated by Sydney Alexander. Princeton: Princeton University Press, 1984. ISBN 0-691-00800-0.
- Hall, Bert S. Weapons and Warfare in Renaissance Europe: Gunpowder, Technology, and Tactics. Baltimore: Johns Hopkins University Press, 1997. ISBN 0-8018-5531-4.
- Simonis, Damien; et al. (January 2004). Lonely Planet's Italy (6th ed.). Lonely Planet Publications. p. 659. ISBN 1-74104-303-4.
- The Sicilian Blade ISBN 978-0-87947-160-6 Author: Vito Quattrocchi
- Miller & G.A. Embleton, "The Swiss at War 1300-1500", Men At Arms 094, Osprey Publishing (1979)
- Erwin Rommel, Infantry Attacks, Zenith Press 2009, ISBN 0-7603-3715-2
