= Chicago Swordplay Guild =

The Chicago Swordplay Guild
- Type: Martial Arts school
- Genre: Historical Martial Arts
- Founded: 1999
- Founder: Gregory Mele and Mark Rector
- Headquarters: United States, Chicago, IL
- Key people: Andrew Curtis Hull White, president
- Website: chicagoswordplayguild.com

The Chicago Swordplay Guild is a modern school of swordsmanship and Western martial arts, and non-profit organization based in Chicago, Illinois, United States. It provides organized instruction in the study and practice of historical European swordplay, with a principal focus on the Italian school of swordsmanship and other martial arts of the 14th–17th centuries. Co-founded in 1999 by Gregory Mele and Mark Rector, the Chicago Swordplay Guild seeks to be consistent with the methodology of the ancient European fencing schools by combining scholarship and research into the teachings of the historical Masters, with the practical knowledge gained through solo and partnered drilling and fencing. Since techniques are taught in reference to how effective they would be in a real encounter, the Guild practices with an absolute emphasis on safety, control, competence, and skill at arms.

== Membership ==
Beginning with a small group of people interested in swordplay the Chicago Swordplay Guild today has more than 50 active members, with dues-paying individuals ranging in age from their late teens to their mid-fifties, and of which 30% are women. A cross-section of the membership includes people in fields such as law, nursing, acting, civil engineering, ichthyology, computer programming, fitness training, paleontology, library science, Renaissance clothing design, publishing, education and the fine arts.

== Location ==
The principal training venue is Forteza Fitness and Martial Arts located in the Ravenswood neighborhood on Chicago's near northside, Forteza is an almost 5,000 sq ft (460 m^{2}) facility that was designed and built specifically for the study of western martial arts. The Chicago Swordplay Guild also has sister schools operating in Milwaukee, Wisconsin (Chicago Swordplay Guild North) and Denver, Colorado (Rocky Mountain Swordplay Guild).

== Curriculum ==
The Guild has a detailed, structured curriculum that focuses on the Italian school of swordsmanship of the 14th–17th centuries. This curriculum is divided into three courses of study; medieval swordsmanship, or armizare, Bolognese fencing, and late Renaissance rapier fencing.

=== The Medieval Italian Tradition ===
The medieval martial arts curriculum is primarily based upon the surviving records of the tradition founded by the Friuli master at arms, Fiore dei Liberi (1350?-1410?). Maestro dei Liberi gave no formal name to his school or his martial art, simply calling it l'arte dell'armi or armizare ("the art of arms"). His art is preserved in the manuscripts he left behind, all entitled il Fior di Battaglia (the Flower of Battle).

The style of Dei Liberi survived after the founder's death due to the surviving manuscript of another master-at-arms, separated from dei Liberi by two to three generations of time. This later master, Filippo Vadi, is known through the treatise he penned c. 1482 entitled De Arte Gladiatoria Dimicandi (also "the art of arms").

=== (Early Renaissance) Bolognese Swordsmanship ===
The primary sources for the Guild's Bolognese Swordsmanship training come from five works from the 16th Century: an Anonymous text of c.1550, Antonio Manciolino (Opera Nova, 1531), Achille Marozzo (Opera Nova, 1536), Angelo Viggiani (Lo Schermo, written c. 1550 and published posthumously in 1575) and Giovanni Dall'Agocchie (Dell'arte di Scrimia, 1575). All of these texts share a consistency of terminology and curriculum that is traced to the most famed teacher of the tradition, Guido Antonio de Luca, from whose school came masters Antonio Manciolino and Achille Marozzo, and the famed condottiero, Giovanni de Medici.

=== The Late Renaissance Italian Tradition ===
The Chicago Swordplay Guild's rapier curriculum is drawn from the great Italian masters of the turn of the 17th century, particularly the work of Grand Master Salvator Fabris (1544–1618) from Padua, Italy. The roster of Fabris' notable students included Prince-Archbishop John Frederick of Bremen and Christian IV, King of Denmark, under whose patronage he published his exceptional rapier-fencing manual Lo Schermo, overo Scienza d'Arme ("on fencing, or martial knowledge").

== Training ==
=== Member Training ===
After completing two introductory classes in their weapon of choice, candidates are invited to join the Chicago Swordplay Guild. In addition to intermediate to advanced techniques in the Italian medieval longsword and Italian Renaissance rapier, Chicago Swordplay Guild members move into the study of historical Italian combat techniques such as medieval grappling (close quarters combat), dagger combat, arming sword, spear and pollaxe. Members of the medieval arts also train in armored combat. Two female members of the Guild currently study the art of medieval mounted combat as taught by the 15th century master at arms, Fiore dei Liberi.

=== Introductory Classes ===
The Chicago Swordplay Guild offers 12-week class sessions in swordsmanship, including Introduction to the medieval Longsword and Introduction to the Renaissance Rapier, year-round through the Chicago Park District, the College Of DuPage and other locations in the Chicago metropolitan area.

== WMAW ==
The Guild and its founders have been active in growing and educating the international western martial arts community. Beginning in fall 1999, the Guild has hosted the biannual Western Martial Arts Workshop), an ever-growing weekend symposium of researchers, instructors and students from the United States, Canada, Europe, Australia and New Zealand.

== Publications ==
The Chicago Swordplay Guild has also been in the forefront of new publications in the Historical European Swordsmanship movement. Co-founders Gregory Mele and Mark Rector have been prolific researchers and have published a number of books and essays on European swordplay.

- Arte Gladitoria Dimicandi: The 15th Century Swordsmanship of Master Filippo Vadi ISBN 1-891448-16-1
- Medieval Combat: A Fifteenth-Century Manual of Swordfighting and Close Quarter Combat ISBN 1-85367-582-2
- Highland Swordsmanship: Techniques of the Scottish Sword Masters ISBN 1-891448-15-3
- In the Service of Mars: Proceedings from the Western Martial Arts Workshop 1999-2009 ISBN 978-0-9825911-5-4

== Affiliates and Sister Schools ==
The Chicago Swordplay Guild maintains close fraternal ties to many different Western martial arts organizations. The following organizations are those with whom the Guild collaborates to share resources and research and to cross-pollinate curriculum and methodology.

- Academy of European Medieval Martial Arts Toronto, Ontario, Canada
- Alliance Martial Arts Ithaca, New York, U.S.
- Les Maitres d'Armes, Ottawa, Ontario, Canada
- Northwest Academy of Arms Eugene, Oregon, U.S.
- Order of the Seven Hearts Alexandria, Virginia, U.S.
- Rocky Mountain Swordplay Guild Denver, Colorado, U.S.
- Selohaar Fechtschule Oxford, Connecticut, U.S.

== See also ==
- Fiore dei Liberi
- Salvator Fabris
- Swordsmanship
- Italian school of swordsmanship
- Historical European martial arts
