= Nova Scrimia =

Nova Scrimia is an Italian organisation which promotes the teaching of the Italian school of swordsmanship, of stick fencing, of short range fencing (dagger) and of unarmed fencing (including grappling like "Abrader" or striking like "mani libere") from the documented period that goes from the 15th century to the 20th century. Nova Scrimia is currently represented in Italy and other European countries, in USA and in Mexico.

The methods proposed start from the one described by Fiore dei Liberi in his 1410 treatise Flos Duellatorum in Armis et sine Armis, (also known as "Fior di Battaglia" (The flower of Battle)). Nova Scrimia teaching follows the rich and uninterrupted literature of Italian fencing and direct teachings and lineage of the Italian fencing Masters of dueling, self-defense and sport combat fencing methods and schools (swords, sticks, daggers/knives, unarmed). The curriculum is divided into modern methods and historical schools, both are studied and practiced for contemporary applications and current use in competitive fighting, dueling and defense.

The methods include the use of medieval and renaissance swords, the 19th century dueling swords (spada e sciabola da duello o da terreno), different stick and dagger methods and hand-to-hand combat (based on grappling and striking methods, ancient boxing and wrestling methods and free hand fencing). All these fencing methods are always characterized to be a "scherma accompagnata", meaning a kind of fencing that always actively uses both hands, with or without a weapon (sword and dagger, two swords, sword and buckler, sword and cape, dagger and cape, two sticks, two daggers, etc.) and in any case it always makes use of the unarmed hand in an active fencing strategy, as if it is a second weapon, a typical characteristic of the Italian school of fencing. All methods, united by the same framework of the art and science of fencing, are practiced for combat and for self-defense.

The Nova Scrimia Group was established in 1990 and founded officially in 1999 in Italy to research and to experiment with the Italian heritage of combat arts. Scrimia is a Renaissance Italian term meaning “fencing”, so the group's name can be translated as "New Fencing". The founder group (or brotherhood) was enriched over time by experts, professionals and passionate people with different expertise: academic, scientific or historical background and curricula; people who brought and contributed with different Italian fencing traditions, people with solid different martial art curricula.

Nova Scrimia Research Group is a collective and collegial work developed to preserve, protect, promote and actualize the Italian Martial Art tradition. Nova Scrimia Italian Martial Art school is based on: preserving the specific fencing principles (like geometry, anatomy and physics); following the science of fencing evolved in Italy and the efficacy of the Art collected and transmitted by the teaching over centuries of duels and battles; maintaining the specific Italian attitude and culture of the dueling and of the fighting that characterize the Art; and finally adapting, at the same time, to the needs, knowledge, culture and technology of the present time.

The Nova Scrimia group has collected many treatises and documents since its birth resulting in a rich ex libris collection. The work of the Nova Scrimia research and development resulted in several publications, articles and books , videos and DVDs . Nova Scrimia has been cited and included or participated in extensive production of publications, websites , documentaries and videos, such as "L'arte di Dar Contraria", an independent production directed by Roberto Totola internationally from the historical and modern fencing context [ to the Mixed Martial Art field, with citations in books such as "Into the Cage: the rises of UFC nation" by Nick Gullo and "Conceptual Modern Arnis" by Bran Frank . Nova Scrimia organizes tournaments and competitions in stickfighting, sword fighting and dagger fighting in many Italian cities.

== Specialties Taught ==
A few of the specialties taught or researched by Nova Scrimia are:

- Unarmed or “Abracar” from techniques of the 15th and 16th century according to Masters Fiore dei Liberi, Filippo Vadi and Achille Marozzo
- Two handed Staff according to the school of Master Cerri (19th century), which employs techniques similar to the two handed sword
- Walking stick according to the system of Master Martinelli (20th century)
- Cornoler stick fighting according to the Venetian School of the 15th and 16th century
- Rondel dagger following the systems of Master Fiore dei Liberi and Master Filippo Vadi
- Dagger and Cape according to Master Achille Marozzo from the 16th century
- Hand-and-a-half sword - 15th century following the systems of Masters Fiore dei Liberi and Filippo Vadi
- Side-sword according to the teachings of Masters Manciolino, Marozzo, Agrippa and Dall'Agocchie (16th century)
- Striscia (Rapier) according to the schools of Masters Docciolini, Capoferro, Giganti, Alfieri and Fabris (17th century)
- Dueling sabre (Sciabola da Terreno) from the systems of Masters Radaelli, Cerri, Lambertini, Viti and Falciani
- Free hand Italian boxing and wrestling for self-defence and combat from the ancient pugilato venetico (venetian boxing) to systems of Masters Carmine, Cougnet and others (19th century).

== Third Party links ==
- Into the Cage: the rise of UFC nation. Book by Nick Gullo
- Conceptual Modern Arnis. Book by Bram Frank
- Bartitsu and Nova Scrimia - Director Ran Arthur Braun
- Bolognese Sword and Dagger Techniques at Academy of European Medieval Martial Arts
- Alliance Martial Arts
- Academy Duello Vancouver, Canada
- Vancouver, Canada
- Vancouver International Swordplay Symposium, Canada
- Forteza Academy, Chicago, USA
- Chicago Swordplay Guild, USA
- Armizare Society
- https://web.archive.org/web/20250430200606/https://www.novascrimia.org/about
- https://web.archive.org/web/20250430200639/https://www.novascrimia.org/landscapes
- https://supersoldierproject.com/european-martial-arts-from-the-battlefield-to-the-arena/
- https://web.archive.org/web/20250430200603/https://supersoldierproject.com/european-martial-arts-from-the-battlefield-to-the-arena/
- https://web.archive.org/web/20250430200907/https://swordis.com/blog/sword-sports/?srsltid=AfmBOoq3LICaqFS_PWOP9F2uAthylVE2tUega6ZpcjpvuVugmH7SnL6R
- https://swordis.com/blog/sword-fighting/
