= Glossary of Italian fencing terms =

Many of the historical techniques currently listed here come from the teachings of Fiore dei Liberi or the Bolognese / Dardi School.

== A ==
a voi
phrase, lit. "to you"
1. Spoken by the director at outset to turn control over to the fencers. Full commencing phrase is "In guardia. Pronti/-e? A voi"

== B ==
balestra
noun f. (plural balestre), lit. "crossbow"
1. A footwork preparation, consisting of a jump or hop forwards with an immediate lunge. This is the definition found in the French national fencing glossary, though it is common in the English world for balestra to refer to only a jump. Jumps are faster than a normal step, which helps change the rhythm and timing of moves

== C ==
colpo fendente
noun m. (plural colpi fendenti), lit. "cleaving blow" [fendente cognate with English fend, both deriving from Latin findō ("cleave, split")]
1. (Fiore) A descending blow which parts the body from the teeth to the knee. Follows the same path as the cut which Dardi authors called mandritto squalembrato
2. (Dardi school) A descending vertical cut

Abbr. fendente

colpo mezano
noun m. (plural colpi mezani), lit. "middle blow"
1. A blow which goes through the middle of fendenti e sottani, delivered with the true edge on the mandritto side and the false edge on the riverso side. Its path is "between the knee and the head"

Abbr. mezano

colpo sottano
noun m. (plural colpi sottani), (archaic) "lower blow"
1. A rising blow which parts the body from the knees to the middle of the forehead

Abbr. sottano

== D ==
dritto
adjective m. (plural dritti), lit. "right (side)"
1. Describes any cut that starts on the fencer's right side. Applies to cuts: falso dritto, fendente dritto, molinetto dritto, e tramazzone dritto. Antonyms: riverso e manco

== F ==
falso
noun m. (plural falsi), lit. "wrong (side)"
1. A rising cut made with the false edge of the blade on the same line as either colpo squalembrato
adjective m.
1. Describes any cut made with the false edge of the blade

fendente
noun m. (plural fendenti)
1. Abbr. of colpo fendente

== I ==
imbroccata
noun f. (plural imbroccate)
1. An overhand descending thrust

in guardia
phrase, lit. "en garde"
1. Spoken by the director to alert fencers to take their stances. Full commencing phrase is "In guardia. Pronti/-e? A voi"

in quartata
phrase
1. An evasive action that is recognized under category of the defensive actions (See also #passata-sotto), made with a quarter turn to the inside that conceals the front but exposes the back. This attempts to move some of the target out of harm’s way during an attack or a counter-attack. This evasive action is often executed and used in conjunction with opposition parry

== M ==
manco
adjective m. (plural manchi), lit. "right (side)". antonyms: riverso, dritto
1. Describes any cut that starts on the fencer's left side. Applies to cuts: falso manco, fendente manco, molinetto manco, e tramazzone manco

mandritto
noun m. (plural mandritti). antonyms: riverso, colpo manco
1. Any cut that starts on the fencer's right side
2. A descending right-to-left diagonal cut on the line from ear to knee, mirroring riverso squalembrato. Also called mandritto squalembrato>

mezano
noun m. (plural mezani)
1. Abbr. of colpo mezano

molinetto
noun m. (plural molinetti)
1. A certain rotational cut

montando
adjective m. (plural montandi), gerund of montare ("to climb")
1. Describes an ascending cut

montante
noun m. (plural montanti), past participle of montare ("to climb")
1. An ascending vertical cut

== P ==
passata-sotto
noun f.
1. An evasive action which is initiated by dropping a hand to the floor and lowering the body under the opponent's oncoming blade. Often accompanied by a straightening of the sword arm to attempt a hit on the opposing combatant

patinando
noun & verb (plural patinandi), gerund of patinare ("to patine")
1. A quickly executed advance-lunge

posta breve
noun f. (plural poste brevi)
1. The short guard

posta breve la serpentina
noun f. (plural poste brevi la serpentina)
1. The short serpent guard

posta dente di zenghiaro
noun f. (plural poste dente di zenghiaro)
1. The boar's tooth guard

Abbr. dente di zenghiaro

posta dente di zenghiaro mezana
noun f. (plural poste dente di zenghiaro mezane)
The middle boar's tooth guard

Abbr. dente di zenghiaro mezana

posta di bicorno
noun f.
The two-horn guard

posta di coda longa
noun f.
The long tail guard. Also posta di choda longa

posta di coda longa la sinestra
noun f.
The left-side long tail guard

posta di crose bastarda
noun f.
The bastard cross guard, a variant of la posta di vera crose. Taking a pass at the opponent from posta breve la serpentina leaves the fencer in posta di crose bastarda, with the pommel towards the opponent

posta di corona
noun f.
The crown guard. Also called posta frontale ("frontal guard")

posta di donna
noun f.
The lady guard

posta di donna la sinestra
noun f.
The left-side lady guard

posta di donna la soprano
noun f.
The high lady guard

posta di fenestra
noun f.
The window guard

posta di fenestra la sinestra
noun f.
The left-side window guard

posta di vera crose
noun f.
The true cross guard

posta frontale
noun f.
The frontal guard. Also called posta di corona ("crown guard")

posta longa
noun f.
The long guard

posta mezza porta di ferro
noun f.
The middle iron gate guard. Also called posta di ferro mezano

posta porta di ferro
noun f.
The iron gate guard

posta porta di ferro la sinestra
noun f.
The left-side iron gate guard

posta porta di ferro tutta
noun f.
The full iron gate guard

posta saggitaria
noun f.
The archer's guard

pronti
adjective m. (singular pronto)
1. Spoken by the director at outset to ask if the fencers are ready to fight. When both fencers are female, the proper word is "pronte." Full commencing phrase is "In guardia. Pronti/-e? A voi"
2. plural of pronto ("ready")

punta
noun f. (plural punte)
1. A thrust, whose path is in the middle of the body from the groin to the forehead. Can be made in five ways: Two high—One left one right—(needs work)
2. lit. "point"

== R ==
ricasso
1. A dull portion of the blade in front of the quillons. In complex rapier and smallsword hilts, the ricasso is behind the guard, or the forward portion of the hilt

ridoppio
noun m. (plural ridoppi)
1. A rising cut with either edge that immediately follows a descending cut
2. lit. "redouble"

riverso
noun m. (plural riversi)
1. Any cut that starts opposite the fencer's dominant side. Antonyms: mandritto, e manco
2. A certain descending diagonal cut on the line from ear to knee. Also called riverso squalembrato. Mirror of mandritto squalembrato

== S ==
stoccata
noun f. (plural stoccate)
1. A rising thrust

sonno serpentino lo soprano
noun m. (plural sonni serpentini lo soprano)
1. Sleeping high serpent (guard)

squalembrato
adjective m. (plural squalembrati)
1. Describes any descending diagonal cut on the line from ear to knee. Applies to i colpi mandritto e riverso. Reverse of il falso

== T ==
tondo
adjective m. (plural tondi)
1. Describes a cut which travels horizontally. Applies to i colpi mandritto e riverso
2. lit. "circular"

tramazzone
noun m. (plural colpi tramazzoni )
1. A certain rotational cut

traversato
adjective m. (plural traversati)
1. Describes a blow made across the line of engagement
2. past participle of traversare ("to cross")
