= Frederico Ghisliero =

Italian fencer and soldier

Fredrico Fabio Ghisliero was an Italian fencer and soldier who wrote his text Regole di molte cavagliereschi essercitii in 1587.

== Career ==
Ghisliero was from an upper class Bolognese family. He listed his profession as "soldier," not master-at-arms. He died at Turin in 1619 after a distinguished military career. Ghisliero apparently wrote other material besides Regole and was a mathematician. His other works on siege warfare, fortification, and artillery were unfortunately lost in a 1904 fire in Italy. Dr. Sydney Anglo recounts that Galileo himself appears to have spent an evening at Ghisliero's home.

== Theories by Ghisliero ==
The geometrical concepts in Ghisliero's treatise are explained by the use of a series of concentric circles, with the center being the duelist's back foot (which was usually the foot on which the majority of one's weight rested in most of the systems of the time). Each concentric circle expanded out from the center by the length of one pace. There were also crossing lines, which shared their common midpoint with the central point of the concentric circles. These crossing lines pointed forward, backward, right, and left, relative to the fencer.

Some fencing historians have hypothesized that Ghisliero's use of geometry evidences the influence of the Spanish school (La Verdadera Destreza). However, though the use of geometry is common to both systems, The Spanish School conceived of a single circle between both fencers. Also, Jeronimo de Carranza, the father of the Spanish school, was heavily influenced by Camillo Agrippa's application of geometry to combat in his book, entitled Trattato di Scientia d'Arme, which also incorporated the idea of a circle that encircled both duelists. Thus, it is possible that Ghisliero's system was influenced purely by Italian sources. The terminology Ghisliero uses in his treatise is the fencing terminology used by his Italian contemporaries (e.g. Mandritto, Riverso, Fendente, Stoccata, et al.), curiously though, Ghisliero used a combination of guard names from various 16th-century Italian schools including some associated with Bolognese Swordsmanship and some of its close relatives (e.g. Guardia di Testa, Guardia di Faccia, and Guardia di Falcone) and the four rotational hand positions from Camillo Agrippa's manual. However, this seemingly arbitrary selection of terminology is not particularly unusual for Italian systems of swordsmanship from the 16th century (for an illustration of this, compare the terminology used by Achille Marozzo with that used by Francesco Altoni).

Like the other systems of swordsmanship prevalent in Europe at the time, Ghisliero's system emphasized the use of the thrust over the cut. He also wrote on the use of the dagger, and the cloak in combination with the sword, which were mainstays of civilian dress, and were often discussed in manuals of the time, especially those related to the Italian school. He was noted by Luis Pacheco de Narváez, a major proponent of the Spanish school, as being one of ten leading experts on mounted combat in Europe at the time. Ghisliero wrote other treatises on artillery, siege warfare and more, however many of these works are now lost. More about him can be found at , where a discussion of his work is given, based on the work of Dr. Sydney Anglo.
