= Classical fencing =

Style of fencing

Classical fencing is the style of fencing as it existed during the 19th and early 20th centuries. According to the 19th-century fencing master Louis Rondelle,

A classical fencer is supposed to be one who observes a fine position, whose attacks are fully developed, whose hits are marvelously accurate, his parries firm, and his ripostes executed with precision. One must not forget that this regularity is not possible unless the adversary is a party to it. It is a conventional bout, which consists of parries, attacks, and returns, all rhyming together.

Used in this sense, classical fencing is a style of historical fencing focusing on the 19th- and early 20th-century national fencing schools, especially in Italy and France, i.e. the schools out of which the styles of contemporary sports fencing have developed. Masters and legendary fencing figures such as Giuseppe Radaelli, Louis Rondelle, Masaniello Parise, the Greco brothers, Aldo Nadi and his rival Lucien Gaudin are today considered typical practitioners of this period.

Classical fencing weapons included the standard foil, épée (using pointes d'arret), and sabre (including both blunted dueling sabres and, beginning in the early 20th century, modern sporting sabres).

== History ==
During the classical period, fencing was used both for sport and preparation for the duel. Fencing as a sport was one of the original events in the Olympic Games and widely practiced at schools and domestic competitions. Additionally, there were professional fencers competing for prize money. Fencing tournaments were extremely popular events, with spectators flocking to see the most celebrated swordsmen battle it out on the piste. In many cases, fencers of the period trained for sport fencing the same way they trained for duels—indeed, many fought highly celebrated duels.

Dueling went into sharp decline after World War I, following the wartime deaths of many members of the classes that practiced it, and the social changes following the war's mass carnage. After World War II, dueling went out of use in Europe except for rare exceptions. Training for a duel, once almost mandatory for males of aristocratic backgrounds, all but disappeared, along with the classes themselves. Fencing continued as a sport like boxing or karate, with tournaments and championships. However, the need to prepare for a duel with "sharps" all but vanished.

Scoring was done by means of four judges who determined if a hit was made. Two side judges stood behind and to the side of each fencer, and watched for hits made by that fencer on the opponent's target. A director followed the fencing from a point several feet away from the center of the action. At the end of each action, after calling "Halt!", the director (or, formally, the president of the jury) would describe the action ("Attack is from my left. Parry and riposte from my right."), and then poll the judges in turn ("Does the attack land?"). The judges would answer "Yes", "Yes, but off-target", "No", or "Abstain". If the judges differed or abstained, the director could overrule them with his vote.

This method was universally used but had limitations. As described in an article in the London newspaper, The Daily Courier, on June 25, 1896: "Every one who has watched a bout with the foils knows that the task of judging the hits is with a pair of amateurs difficult enough, and with a well-matched pair of maîtres d’escrime well-nigh impossible." There also were problems with bias: well-known fencers were often given the benefit of mistakes (so-called "reputation touches"), and in some cases, there was outright cheating. Aldo Nadi complained about this in his autobiography The Living Sword in regard to his famous match with Lucien Gaudin.

The article in the Daily Courier described a new invention, the electrical scoring machine, that would revolutionize fencing. Starting with épée in the 1930s (foil was electrified in the 1950s, sabre in the 1980s), side judges were replaced by an electrical scoring apparatus, with an audible tone and a red or green light indicating when a touch landed. The scoring box reduced the bias in judging and permitted more accurate scoring of faster actions, lighter touches, and more touches to the back and flank than were possible with human judges.

The advent of the electrical scoring apparatus had far-reaching consequences. The electrical scoring apparatus and the 20th century's overall modernization of athletic activities occurred alongside an increase in the emphasis on fencing as a sport. The electrical scoring apparatus encouraged an emphasis on the athletic and offensive (rather than defensive) aspects of fencing by altering the ways in which a touch would be considered valid. The result was an eventual schism between sport and classical fencing, both stylistically and philosophically.

At the time electronic scoring was introduced, all fencers were classically trained, but there were differences in accepting 20th-century changes in fencing practice. The fencing masters who rejected these changes either preserved their tradition, abandoned it in favor of employment as fencing masters in sport fencing, or, as time passed, simply retired. However, enough classically oriented fencers remained to keep traditional, classical fencing alive. Many people self-identify as classical fencers, but do not share the concept of classical fencing described in this article, preferring the early to mid-20th-century style of competitive fencing (which, in the United States, was formalized and governed by the American Fencing League, or AFL) to the more classical style of the 19th century. This should not be confused with the Amateur Fencers League of America (AFLA), which was renamed to the current United States Fencing Association (USFA) in 1981, which is affiliated with the FIE.

== Revival ==
In the United States (and elsewhere), renewed interest in Western martial arts (beginning in the 1990s) has led some groups—often peer-led—to attempt to study classical fencing (e.g. from books or instructional videos) without the guidance of a classically trained instructor, creating further variation in the classical fencing community. These groups, in an effort to become more historically authentic, sometimes shift their focus to older, pre-19th-century weapons and techniques—i.e. historical fencing.

Today, classical fencing clubs (and classical fencing instructors and masters) can be found in Europe, the United States, Canada, and Australia. Because there is no agreement as to the exact rules of classical fencing and because competition is de-emphasized, what competitions exist are generally local or regional in nature, with the rules depending upon where the tournament is held.

However, there are a number of generalizations that unify contemporary classical fencing.

First of these is the expression that "classical fencing is a frank encounter between two opponents" where the object is to touch the other fencer without being touched. Even though the "weapons" are blunt, the fencers treat them as though they were in fact sharp.

Classical fencing still uses the same weapons that have been used in fencing since the early 19th century—namely, the standard (non-electric) foil, standard épée (equipped with a pointe d'arret), and sabre (including both blunted dueling sabres and modern standard sporting sabres).

Olympic and classical fencing differ in the use of weapon grips for foil and épée. In sport fencing, the most used handle for foil and épée is the pistol grip, with the French retaining significant use in épée. Classical fencing prohibits the pistol grip and uses the Italian and French grips primarily, and occasionally the Spanish grip.

Safety equipment for classical fencing is essentially the same as used in Olympic fencing. It includes:

- A fencing glove, which protects the hand and overlaps the sleeve of the jacket.
- A fencing mask, typically made of a wire mesh;
- A white fencing jacket, which may be canvas duck, stretch nylon, or some other puncture-resistant material; and

Fencers also usually wear breeches of material similar to the jacket, with knee-high white socks, or long pants and athletic shoes. There should be no exposed flesh.

In addition, female fencers wear rigid breast protection in the form of cups or a chest plate (as do some male fencers, albeit a flat chest plate in that case). Male fencers often wear an athletic cup. Fencers of both genders wear an underarm protector called a plastron worn on the side of the fencer facing the opponent. This provides additional protection in the event of a broken blade penetrating the fencing jacket.
