= De Arte Gladiatoria Dimicandi =

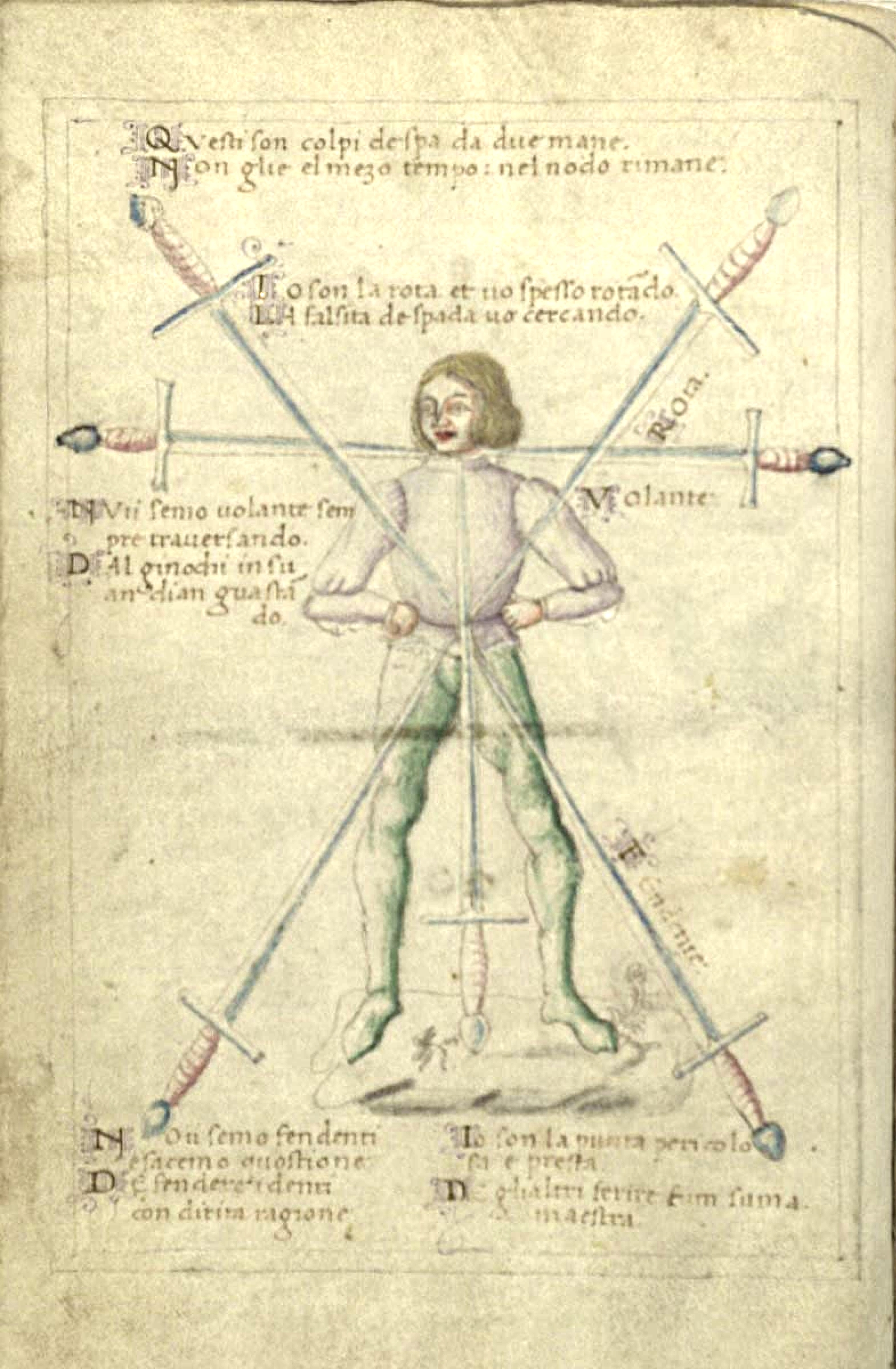
The sette spade Diagram from the MS Vitt. Em. 1324 (fol. 15v).

De Arte Gladiatoria Dimicandi was written by Italian fencing master Filippo Vadi between 1482 and 1487. It consists of an opening prologue describing the art of fencing followed by colored plates illustrating specific techniques for the longsword, dagger, pollaxe, spear and club. While much of what he describes closely follows the work of Fiore dei Liberi, author of Flos Duellatorum, Vadi's work also differs in some respects, including his footwork and several original techniques of his own.

Little is known about the author, a native of Pisa, other than that he appears to have been a mid to late 15th-century fencing master linked in some way to the tradition of Fiore dei Liberi and that he dedicated a fencing book to the Dukes of Urbino, in the last quarter of the 15th century. However, a man of the same name appears as a governor of Reggio under the Estense family in the mid- to late 15th century. The book was dedicated to Duke Guidobaldo da Montefeltro (the same duke who plays a central role in Castiglione's Book of the Courtier) and kept in the library of the Dukes of Urbino.

== See also ==
- Italian school of swordsmanship
