= Giuseppe Radaelli =

Giuseppe Radaelli (1833 - 1882) was a 19th-century Milanese fencing champion. Often regarded as "the father of modern sabre fencing", his sabre fencing principles were popularised throughout Europe via his students such as Luigi Barbasetti, Ferdinando Masiello, Salvatore Pecoraro, and Carlo Pessina.

== See also ==
- Italian school of swordsmanship
- Classical fencing
- German school of swordsmanship
- Historical European martial arts
