= Giuseppe Rosaroll =

Italian military officer (1775–1825)

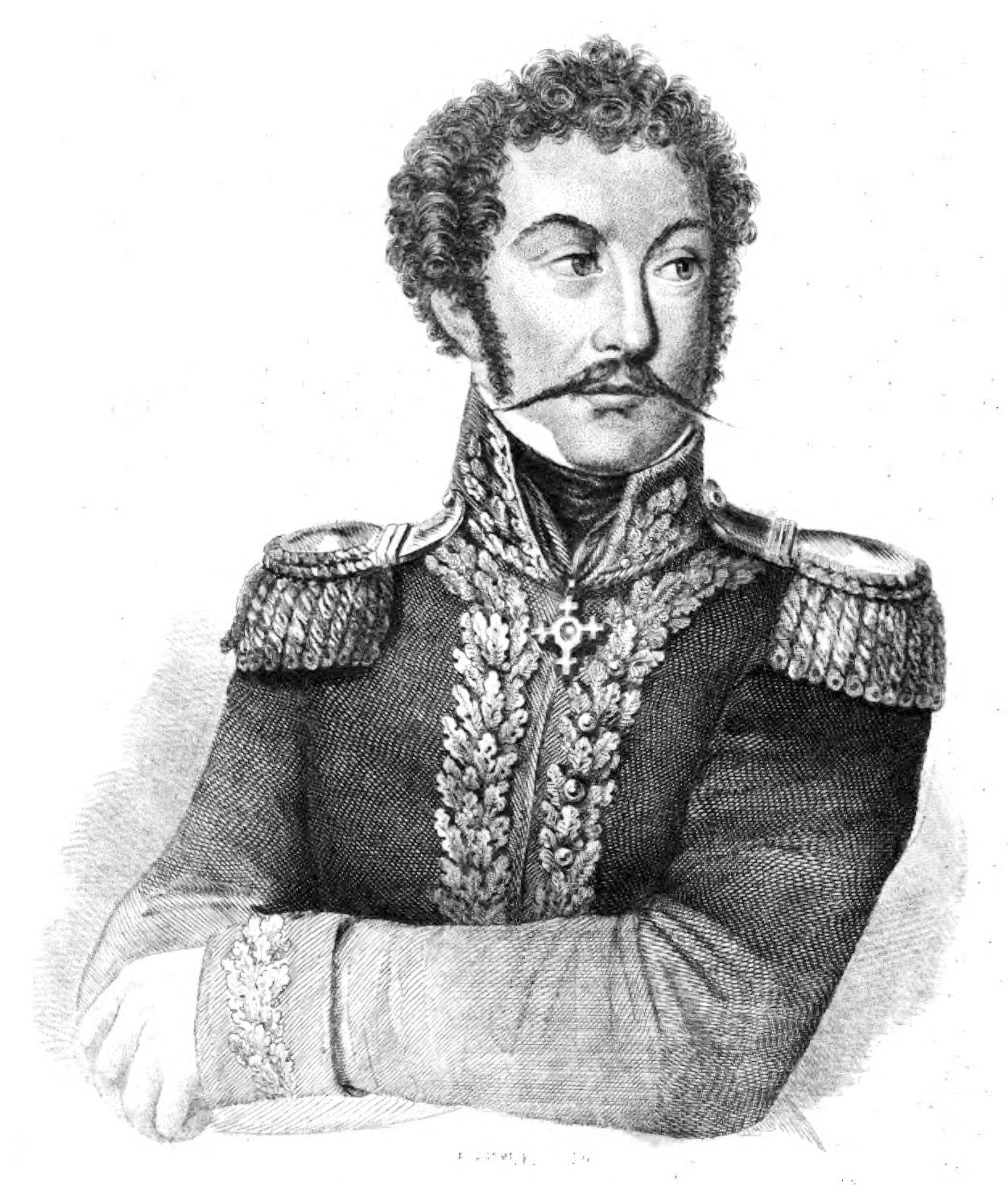
- Born: 16 September 1775; Naples, Italy
- Died: 2 December 1825 (aged 50); Nafplion, Italy
- Occupations: Essayist, military officer

Giuseppe Maria Rosaroll-Scorza (16 September 1775 – 2 December 1825) was an Italian essayist and a general in the army of the Kingdom of the Two Sicilies. He was also the father of the Italian patriotic hero Cesare Rosaroll.

== Military career ==
Born in Naples from a family of Swiss origin, he entered as a cadet in the Neapolitan Army in 1793. In 1799, he joined the Parthenopaean Republic as a captain. Captured by the Sanfedisti and condemned to death, he escaped to France before re-entering Italy with Napoleon Bonaparte, serving in the Italian Legion.

Rosaroll fought in the Battle of Marengo, later joining the Army of the Cisalpine Republic. In Milan he wrote a treatise on the art of fencing, La scienza della scherma.

He returned to Naples with General Masséna in 1806. His brave conduct in the campaign of Sicily of 1811 with Joachim Murat, won him an 1812 promotion to the rank of field marshal and was titled Baron of the Empire. Again with Murat he participated in the Russian campaign.

After the Restoration (1815) Rosaroll received command of a brigade and then of the division of Messina from king Ferdinand I. During this period he wrote numerous treatises on military techniques.

As commander of Messina in March 1821 he tried to organise the military forces of the Two Sicilies stationed in Sicily and Calabria to resist the Austrians who were entering the Kingdom in order to repress the Constitutional Revolt of 1820.

In order to escape his death sentence for this act (sentence of 27 February 1823), he fled to Spain, where he joined the ranks of the liberal constitutionalist forces from 1822 to 1823. In spring 1823, the Spanish revolution was put down by the French Army, general Rosaroll moved again, first to England and then to Greece, where the Greek War of Independence was raging. According to historian T. Gerozisis, which is based on the testimony of Dionysios Romas and Fotakos, Rosaroll's old acquaintance and friend from Zante, Theodoros Kolokotronis, intended to make him commander of ground forces. Before the interim government enacted this, Rosaroll died of typhus in Nauplia. His son César died fighting against the Austrians at Venice in 1849.

Historian of fencing Jacopo Gelli considered Rosaroll and Pietro Grisetti as the scions of the true "Scuola Napoletana" of fencing. Both were students of Tommaso Bosco e Fucile, who was a maestro of fencing in Naples.

== See also ==
- Italian school of swordsmanship

== Bibliography ==
- "La scienza della scherma esposta dai due amici il barone Rosaroll Scorza commendatore dell'ordine reale delle Due Sicilie, maresciallo di campo ecc. e Pietro Grisetti capo di battaglione del I.mo reggimento dell'artiglieria". Napoli : nella Stamperia Reale, 1814
- "Scherma della bajonetta astata. Del barone Rosaroll Scorza, commendatore dell'ordine reale delle Due Sicilie, maresciallo di campo ecc.". Napoli : dalla stamperie de' fratelli Fernandes, strada ponte di Tappia, n. 18, 1818
- "Trattato della Spadancia, o sia della Spada Larga". Napoli : stamperia fratelli Fernandes, 1818

== Sources ==
- Gelli, Jacopo (1895). Bibliografia generale della scherma, con note critiche, biografiche e storiche. Hoepli.
