= Italian school of swordsmanship =

Style of combat from the 15th century to the 19th century

Italian School of Swordsmanship
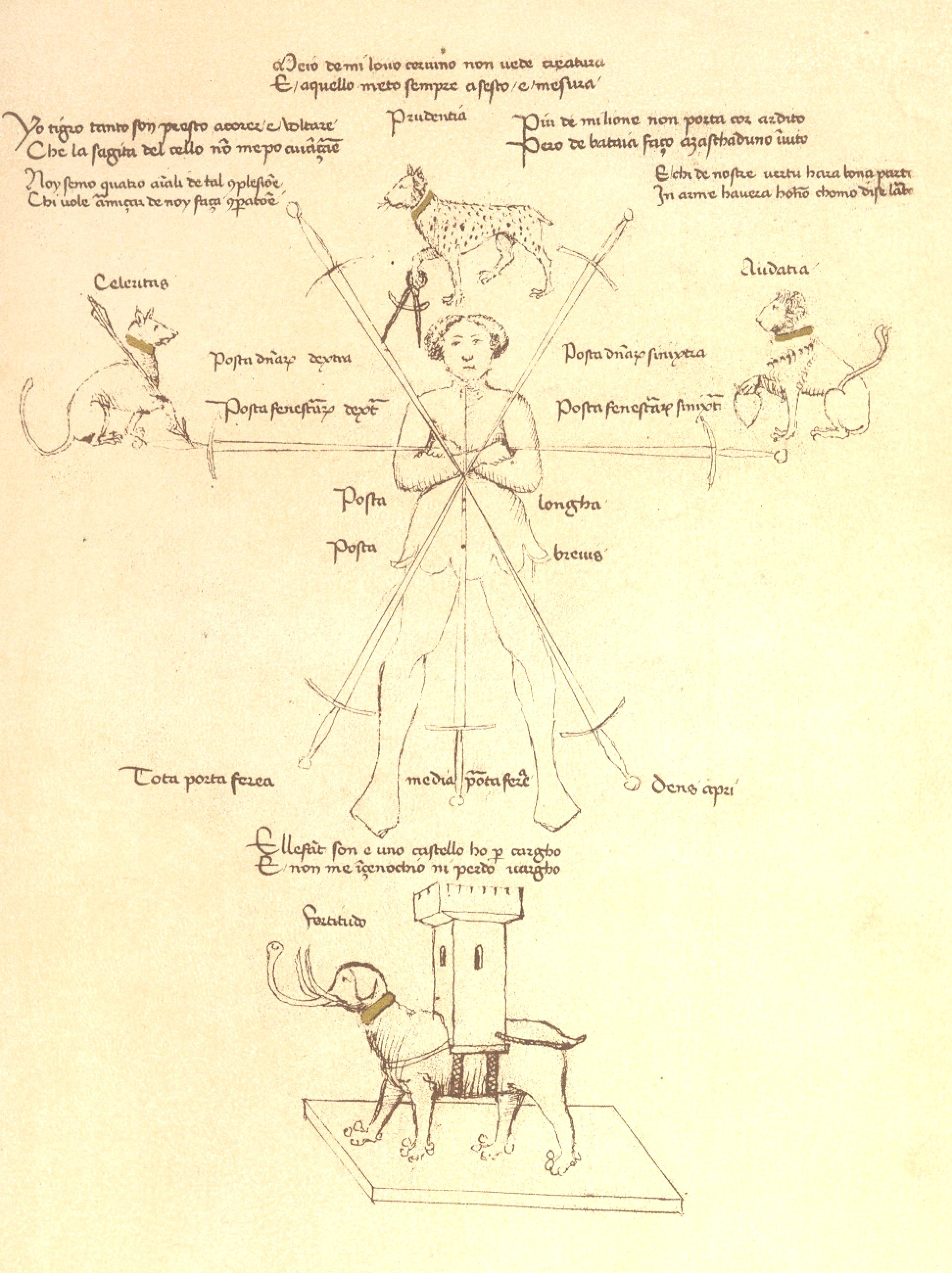
- The sette spade Diagram from the Pisani facsimile of the Flos Duellatorum (fol. 17A). The four animals symbolize prudence (lynx), celerity (tiger), audacity (lion), and fortitude (elephant).
- Also known as: La Scuola Della Spada Italiana
- Focus: Weaponry
- Country of origin: Italy
- Creator: Historical
- Famous practitioners: Fiore dei Liberi, Filippo Vadi, Achille Marozzo, Antonio Manciolino, Angelo Viggiani,
- Descendant arts: Modern fencing
- Olympic sport: No

The term Italian school of swordsmanship is used to describe the Italian style of fencing and edged-weapon combat from the time of the first extant Italian swordsmanship treatise (1409) to the days of classical fencing (up to the modern day).

Although the weapons and the reason for their use changed dramatically throughout these five centuries, a few fundamental traits have remained constant in the Italian school. Some of these are the preference for certain guards, the preoccupation with time (or "tempo") in fencing as well as many of the defensive actions.

The Dardi school of fencing with the spada da lato was one of the influences of the early modern style of fencing.

== Renaissance to Baroque period ==
One of the earliest known Italian treatises on swordsmanship and other martial arts is the Flos Duellatorum (Fior Di Battaglia/The Flower of Battle) written by Fiore dei Liberi around 1409. Fiore's treatise describes an advanced martial arts system of grappling, dagger, short sword, longsword, pollaxe, and spear. Another important treatise, De Arte Gladiatoria Dimicandi, was written by Filippo Vadi sometime between 1482 and 1487. Although different, Vadi's work appears to be based upon Fiore's earlier work. It has been suggested that Vadi's style of swordsmanship represents a transitional phase between that of Fiore and the later Bolognese masters.

A general survey of the 16th-century Italian manuals shows instruction for the following weapon or weapon combinations in at least one published manual:

- Dagger
- Dagger and cape
- Halberd
- Lance
- Partisan (weapon)
- Partisan and shield
- Pike
- Ronca (weapon)
- Spetum
- Sword alone
- Sword and broad buckler
- Sword and cape
- Sword and dagger
- Sword and gauntlet
- Sword and rotella
- Sword and small buckler
- Sword and targa
- Sword for two hands (also referred to as the spadone by some masters)
- Two swords
- Unarmed against dagger

The most significant group of authors from this time were those from the Bolognese school and it included such masters as Achille Marozzo, Antonio Manciolino, Angelo Viggiani and Giovanni dall'Agocchie. However, there were other Italian authors not directly associated with the Bolognese school including Camillo Agrippa (who has the distinction of codifying the four guards—prima, seconda, terza, and quarta—that survive to this day), Giacomo di Grassi who wrote a manual in 1570 which was translated into English in the 1590s.

With the 17th century came the popularity of the rapier and a new century of masters, including Salvator Fabris, Ridolfo Capoferro, and Francesco Antonio Marcelli. Unlike the manuals of the previous century, those written in the 17th century were generally restricted to covering only the rapier being used alone or with a companion arm (such as the dagger, cloak, or rotella). By the end of the 17th century, the manuals begin to take on a more classical character in both the terminology and the presentation of the techniques.

== Classical ==
Although there is a considerable gap in extant Italian treatises, between 1696 and 1800, we can see from the earliest 19th-century treatises that the style had changed very little during that period. The only changes were the addition of certain techniques suitable for the somewhat lighter blades of the dueling swords typically used in 1800 as compared to the rapiers typical for the end of the 17th century (compare the techniques presented by Bondì di Mazo in his 1696 manual with those in the 1803 manual of Giuseppe Rosaroll-Scorza and Pietro Grisetti). Even at the beginning of the 19th century, techniques for coming to grips were still being taught and the use of the dagger as an accompanying weapon was still discussed (although not as a prominent and popular choice).

By the end of the 19th century, the immediate ancestor of modern fencing had developed with its familiar pedagogy and collection of techniques and theory. At this time, the two predominant schools within the Italian tradition are the Radaellian (after Maestro Giuseppe Radaelli) and the Neapolitan. In 1883 the Italian Ministry of War selected the treatise by Neapolitan Masaniello Parise to be the official syllabus of the newly founded Scuola Magistrale of fencing (now called Classical Italian Fencing). Parise's teachings survive to this day almost unchanged, although many of Radaelli's saber teachings were incorporated.

== Contemporary practice ==
In Italy, the National Academy (Accademia Nazionale) certifies masters in both historical fencing and modern fencing based on careful adherence to the principles of Italian swordsmanship. Abroad, the Italian style is cultivated by professional institutions such as the San Jose State fencing program (California, United States), where Maestro William Gaugler ran a program largely based on the classical style of Parise.

The Historical European martial arts (HEMA) and the Western Martial Arts (WMA) communities in Europe and the United States have practitioners of Italian masters such as Fiore dei Liberi, Filippo Vadi, Achille Marozzo, Salvator Fabris, Ridolfo Capo Ferro, Francesco Alfieri, etc. Practitioners include Brian R. Price of the Schola Saint George, Bob Charron of St. Martin's Academy (both studying Fiore dei Liberi), Gregory Mele of the Chicago Swordplay Guild (studying Fiore and Vadi), Matt Easton of London's Schola Gladiatoria, Ken Harding of the St Louis School of Arms, and Guy Windsor, of Finland's School of European Swordsmanship.

== Treatises ==
Some treatises by Italian masters:

Medieval/Early Renaissance

- Filippo Vadi, De Arte Gladiatoria Dimicandi - 1482-1487
- Fiore dei Liberi, Flos Duellatorum in armis, sine armis, equester et pedester - 1409
- Pietro Monte, Exercitiorum Atque Artis Militaris Collectanea in Tris Libros Distincta - 1509

Renaissance/Baroque

- Achille Marozzo, Dardi school, Opera Nova Chiamata Duello, O Vero Fiore dell'Armi de Singulari Abattimenti Offensivi, & Diffensivi - 1536
- Angelo Viggiani dal Montone, Dardi school, Trattato dello Schermo - 1575
- Anonimo Bolognese, Dardi school, L'Arte della Spada (M-345/M-346 Manuscripts) - (early or mid 16th century)
- Antonio Manciolino, Dardi school, Opera Nova per Imparare a Combattere, & Schermire d'ogni sorte Armi - 1531
- Bondì di Mazo, La Spada Maestra - 1696
- Camillo Agrippa, Trattato di Scientia d'Arme con un Dialogo di Filosofia - 1553
- Francesco Alfieri, La Scherma di Francesco Alfieri - 1640
- Francesco Altoni, Monomachia: Trattato dell'Arte di Scherma - c. 1550
- Francesco Antonio Marcelli, Regole della Scherma - 1686
- Giacomo di Grassi, Ragion di Adoprar Sicuramente l'Arme si da Offesa, come da Difesa - 1570
- Giovanni Antonio Lovino, Prattica e theorica del bene adoperare tutte le sorti di arme c. 1580
- Giovanni dall'Agocchie, Dardi school, Dell'Arte di Scrimia - 1572
- Giuseppe Morsicato Pallavicini, La Scherma Illustrata - 1670
- Giuseppe Morsicato Pallavicini, La seconda parte della Scherma Illustrata - 1673
- Marco Docciolini, Trattato in Materia di Scherma - 1601
- Nicoletto Giganti, Scola overo Teatro - 1606
- Ridolfo Capoferro, Gran Simulacro dell'Arte e dell'Uso della Scherma - 1610
- Salvator Fabris, De lo Schermo ovvero Scienza d'Armi - 1606
- Vincentio Saviolo, His Practise - 1595

Classical

- Giuseppe Radaelli, La Scherma di Sciabola e di Spada - 1876
- Giuseppe Rosaroll-Scorza and Pietro Grisetti, La Scienza della Scherma - 1803 - 1871 3rd ed.
- Masaniello Parise, Trattato della Scherma di Spada e Sciabola - 1883 1st ed. - 1904 5th ed.
- Masiello, Ferdinando, and Ciullini (The Broadsword) - 1889
- Masiello, Ferdinando, La Scherma di Fioretto. 2nd ed. - 1902
- Masiello, Ferdinando, La Scherma di Sciabola. 3rd ed. - 1902
- Masiello, Ferdinando, Trattato teorico-pratico della scherma di spada e sciabola - 1884
- Pecoraro, Salvatore e Pessina, Carlo. La Sciabola - 1910
- William M. Gaugler, The Science of Fencing. Revised ed. - 2004. ISBN 1-884528-05-8.

== See also ==
- Fiore dei Liberi
- German school of swordsmanship
- Historical European martial arts
- Italian martial arts
- Spanish school of fencing

== Literature ==
- Battistini, A., J. Venni and M. Rubboli, eds. Monomachia - Trattato dell'Arte della Scherma di Sandro Altoni Francesco. Rimini: Il Cerchio, 2007. Print. ISBN 88-8474-147-5
- Butera, Matteo, Francesco Lanza, Jherek Swanger, and Reinier van Noort The Spada Maestra of Bondì di Mazo. Nordkisa, Norway: Van Noort, Reinier, 2016. ISBN 978-82-690382-0-0
- Leoni, Tomasso, tr. The Complete Renaissance Swordsman: A Guide to the Use of All Manner of Weapons ~ Antonio Manciolino's Opera Nova (1531). Wheaton, IL: Freelance Academy Press, 2010. Print. ISBN 978-0-9825911-3-0
- Leoni, Tomasso, tr. Venetian Rapier: The School, or Salle ~ Nicoletto Giganti's 1606 Rapier Fencing Curriculum. Wheaton, IL: Freelance Academy Press, 2010. Print. ISBN 978-0-9825911-2-3
- Leoni, Tomasso. The Art of Dueling: Salvator Fabris' Fencing Treatise of 1606. Union City, Calif.: The Chivalry Bookshelf, 2004. Print. ISBN 978-1-891448-23-2
- Mele, Gregory D., ed. In the Service of Mars: Proceedings from the Western Martial Arts Workshop 1999–2009, Volume I. Freelance Academy Press, 2010. Print. ISBN 978-0-9825911-5-4
- Porzio, Luca, tr., and Gregory D. Mele. Arte Gladitoria: 15th Century Swordsmanship of Master Filippo Vadi. Union City, Calif.: The Chivalry Bookshelf, 2002. Print. ISBN 1-891448-16-1
- Rubboli, Marco and A. Battistini, eds. Opera Nova di Antonio Manciolino. Rimini: Il Cerchio, 2008. Print. ISBN 88-8474-176-9
- Rubboli, Marco, and Luca Cesari, eds. Anonimo Bolognese - L'Arte della Spada, Trattato di scherma dell'inizio del XVI secolo. Rimini: Il Cerchio, 2005. Print. ISBN 88-8474-093-2.
- Rubboli, Marco, and Luca Cesari, eds. Flos Duellatorum - Manuale di Arte del Combattimento del XV secolo di Fiore dei Liberi. Rimini: Il Cerchio, 2002. Print. ISBN 88-8474-079-7
- Rubboli, Marco, and Luca Cesari, eds. L'Arte Cavalleresca del Combattimento - De Arte Gladiatoria Dimicandi di Filippo Vadi. Rimini: Il Cerchio, 2001. Print. ISBN 88-8474-023-1
- William M. Gaugler, Lance C. Lobo The History of Fencing: Foundations of Modern European Swordplay. 1997. ISBN 978-18-845281-6-3
- Windsor, Guy. The Swordsman's Companion: A Modern Training Manual for Medieval Longsword. Union City, Calif.: The Chivalry Bookshelf, 2004. Print. ISBN 1-891448-41-2
- Windsor, Guy. The Duellist's Companion: a Training Manual for 17th Century Italian Rapier. Highland Village, TX.: The Chivalry Bookshelf, 2006. Print. ISBN 1-891448-32-3
