= Pietro Monte =

Pietro Monte (Pietro del Monte, Pietro Monti, Latinized Petrus Montius; 1457–1509) was a master of arms who lived in Milan in the late 15th century. He may have been either Spanish or Italian by birth. He was acquainted with Leonardo da Vinci.

He is mentioned in Baldassarre Castiglione's Libro del Cortegiano as the teacher of Galeazzo da Sanseverino, described as "the true and only master of every form of trained strength and agility".

Monte is assumed to have compiled at least four combat treatises in the 1480s. His De Dignoscendis Hominibus was printed in 1492, but the others remained unpublished until his death in 1509, when they were edited by one Giovanni Angelo Scinzenzeler as Exercitiorum Atque Artis Militaris Collectanea (known as Collectanea for short) and as De Singulari Certamine Sive Dissentione, De veritate unius legis et falsitate sectatrum. Milano 1509 (2nd ed. 1522). Two of Monte's manuscripts also survive, one kept in the Escorial library as MS A.IV.23 (written in Spanish), the other in Biblioteca Estense as Codex Estense T.VII.25 (written in Italian). Monte was a condottiere who served in many armies with his military skill. Although his works are written in Latin, they served to teach multi-lingual armies of the time. Monte's system of fencing predates the classical Italian school of swordsmanship (the Dardi school later in the 16th century). He was famous during his own time, but his system does not appear to have directly influenced his successors, and his work was largely forgotten. He prefers ascending cuts over descending ones, and cuts from the right over cuts from the left, but considers the thrust (stocchata vel puncta) the most effective of all. He recommends combining a series of cuts followed by a thrust "to finish". Monte is forgotten as a fencing master, but remembered as an Italian war hero, as he would rather die than leave the place he was ordered to defend. According to Sansovino the French King Louis XII sent out to search for the body of Monte on the battleground to have him buried with royal honours. According to historians, if everybody would have done his duty like Monte Venice would have won the battle near Agnadel.

== See also ==
- Dardi school
