= Collection Ludwig =

Collection of porcelain and faience in Germany

- Housed at: Altes Rathaus
- Funded by: Peter and Irene Ludwig

The Sammlung Ludwig is a collection of porcelain and faience in Bamberg, Germany. Privately owned by the married couple Peter and Irene Ludwig, it has been on display in the Altes Rathaus since 1995.

This collection contains both arts from India, China and Africa and manufactured items of all art historical epochs. The worldwide known Meißner manufactory, in former times one of the biggest porcelain manufactories of Germany, is also exhibited, as well as French Strasbourg faience.
