= Filippo Vadi =

Italian fencing master

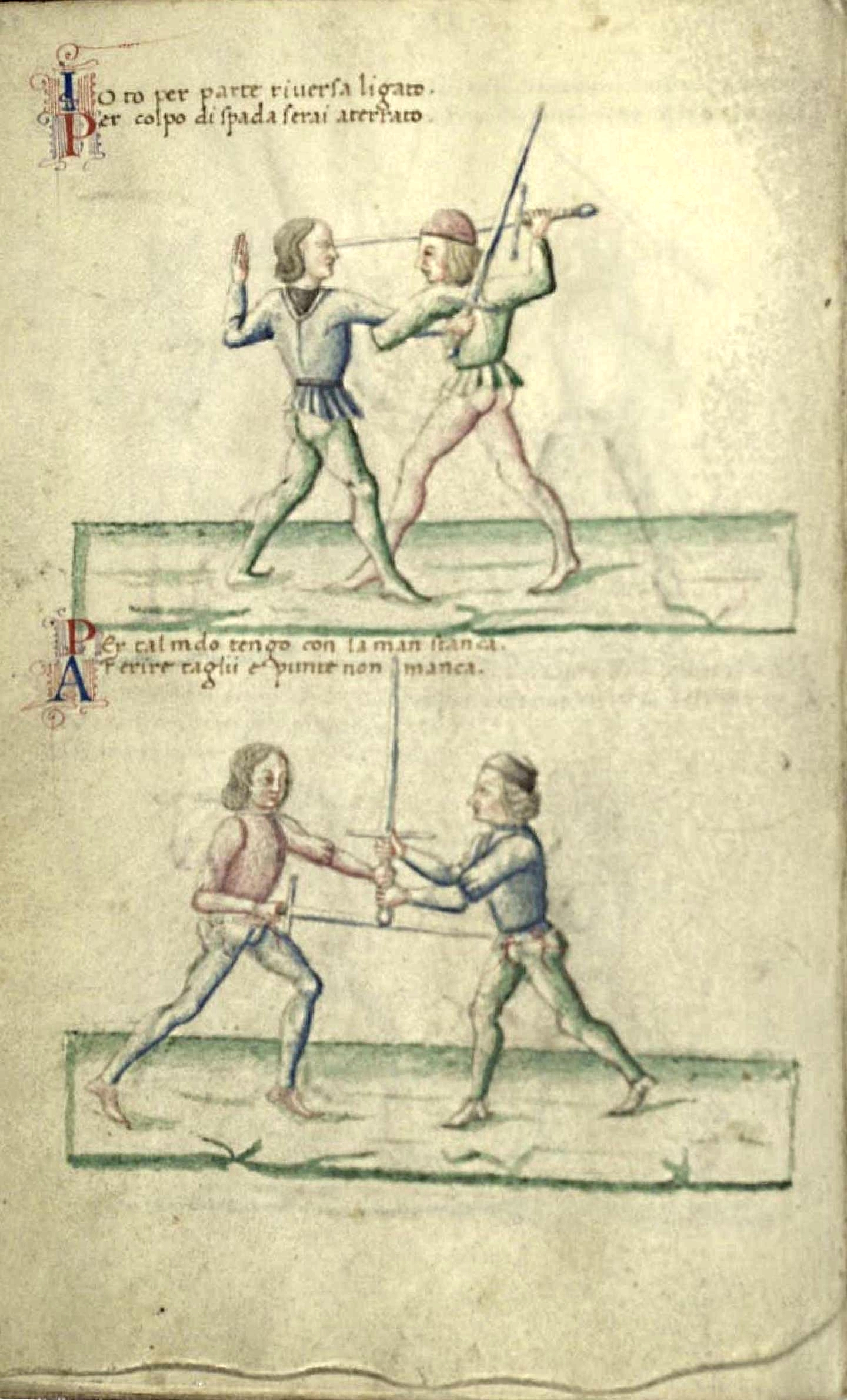
- Illustration from Filippo Vadi's De Arte Gladiatoria Dimicandi, National Central Library of Rome, Codex 1324
- Born: 1425; Pisa, Republic of Pisa
- Died: 1501 (aged 75–76); Urbino, Duchy of Urbino
- Employers: Leonello d'Este; Borso d'Este
- Known for: Fencing theorist, Civil servant
- Notable work: De Arte Gladiatoria Dimicandi (1482-1487)

Filippo Vadi (Latin: Philippus de Vadis de Pisis; 1425 – 1501) was an Italian fencing master of the 15th century. Together with Fiore dei Liberi, he is one of the earliest Italian masters from whom an extant martial arts manual has survived.

== Biography ==
Very little is known about Vadi. Born in Pisa, he studied fencing with masters across Europe. He was governor of Reggio under Marquis Leonello d'Este and later, from 1452 to 1470, counselor to Leonello's successor and brother, the Duke of Ferrara Borso d'Este. The Venetian medalist Giovanni Boldù coined a commemorative medal for Vadi in 1457, with the obverse showing a figure in antique armor holding a longsword and the words Phillippus de Vadis de Pisis Chironem Superans (Filippo Vadi of Pisa, exceeding Chiron).

Between 1482 and 1487 he wrote a treatise on fencing dedicated to Guidobaldo da Montefeltro, Duke of Urbino, De Arte Gladiatoria Dimicandi ("Of the Art of Sword Combat"). This lavish colour manuscript is one of the key works of Italian swordsmanship and forms an important link between the early 15th century works of Fiore dei Liberi and the Renaissance Bolognese school of fencing.

The manual covers the standard knightly weapons of the time: sword, dagger, spear, and poleaxe. Vadi's book mainly focuses on the use of the longsword, or, as it was called at the time, the spada da doi mani (“two handed sword”). His instructions are clear and precise, enabling reconstruction of medieval swordsmanship from Late Medieval Italy.

The illustrations and techniques in the treatise suggest that Vadi was influenced by the work of Fiore dei Liberi, author of the Flos Duellatorum. As both Leonello and Borso d'Este were sons of Niccolò III, owner of two copies of Fiore's treatise, Vadi would have had ample opportunity to study his writings. Vadi's work, however, differs from Fiore's in several respects, including his footwork and several original techniques of his own.

Vadi prefaced his treatise with a sixteen-chapter tract discussing several of his philosophies regarding combat. According to Vadi "fencing is born out of geometry" and ought to be considered a science:

If you wish to truly know if fencing is an art or science hark my words, I say. Ponder this, my statement: it is a true science and not an art and Geometry, which divides and separates, by infinite numbers and measures and fills her papers with science, shows this with its pithy eloquence. The sword is placed in her care, so measure blows and steps together so science keeps you safe. From Geometry fencing is born, and under her it has no end; and both of them are infinite.

The idea of the swordsmanship as a perfect and calculated science will be fully developed in later Renaissance fencing manuals such as the Treatise on the Science of Arms by Camillo Agrippa, and the Art and Use of Fencing by Ridolfo Capo Ferro.

Vadi's manuscript was included in the catalogue of the Ducal Library of Urbino made by Ludovico Odasio, a Paduan humanist who had been Guidolbaldo's tutor. It is now preserved at the National Central Library of Rome (MS Vitt. Em. 1324).

== Works ==
- Vadi, Filippo (1482–1487). De arte gladiatoria dimicandi (in Italian).
- Vadi, Filippo (2005). Marco Rubboli; Luca Cesari (eds.). L'arte cavalleresca del combattimento. Rimini: Il Cerchio editore. ISBN 88-8474-079-7.

=== Works in English translation ===
- Gregory Mele, ed. (2004). Arte Gladiatoria Dimicandi: 15th Century Swordsmanship of Master Fillipo Vadi. Translated by Luca Porzio. Union City: Chivalry Bookshelf. ISBN 1-891448-16-1.
- Windsor, Guy (2013). Veni Vadi Vici: a transcription, translation and commentary on Philippo Vadi's De Arte Gladiatoria Dimicandi. Helsinki: School of European Swordsmanship.

== Bibliography ==
- Berwinkel, Holger (March 2004). "Review of Arte Gladiatoria Dimicandi: The 15th Century Swordsmanship of Master Filippo Vadi, Luca Porzio and Gregory Mele (eds.)". Medieval History Magazine.
- Castagnaro, Federica (2009–2010). "La scherma nei trattati italiani del Cinquecento: immagini e parole". Ludica: Annali di storia e civiltà del gioco. 15/16 (15/16): 55–72. doi:10.23744/1936.
- Windsor, Guy (2012). "Italian Longsword Guards: Comparing Vadi's Guards with Fiore and Marozzo" (PDF).
- Deacon, J. H. (2016). "Prologues, Poetry, Prose and Portrayals: The Purposes of Fifteenth Century Fight Books According to the Diplomatic Evidence". Acta Periodica Duellatorum. 4 (2): 69–90. doi:10.36950/apd-2016-014.
- Deacon, Jacob Henry (2017). "Filippo Vadi's martial philosophies: a salty brain and climbing stairs". Medieval Warfare. 7 (5): 38–43. JSTOR 48578123.
- Morosini, Giulia (2017). "The Body of the Condottiero. A Link Between Physical Pain and Military Virtue as it was Interpreted in Renaissance Italy". In Jörg Rogge (ed.). Killing and Being Killed: Bodies in Battle: Perspectives on Fighters in the Middle Ages. Bielefeld: transcript Verlag. pp. 165–198. doi:10.1515/9783839437834-010. ISBN 978-3-8394-3783-4.
- Mondschein, K. (2018). "On the Art of Fighting: A Humanist Translation of Fiore dei Liberi's Flower of Battle Owned by Leonello D'Este". Acta Periodica Duellatorum. 6 (1): 99–135. doi:10.2478/apd-2018-0004.
