= Antonio Francesco Manciolino =

Italian swordsman

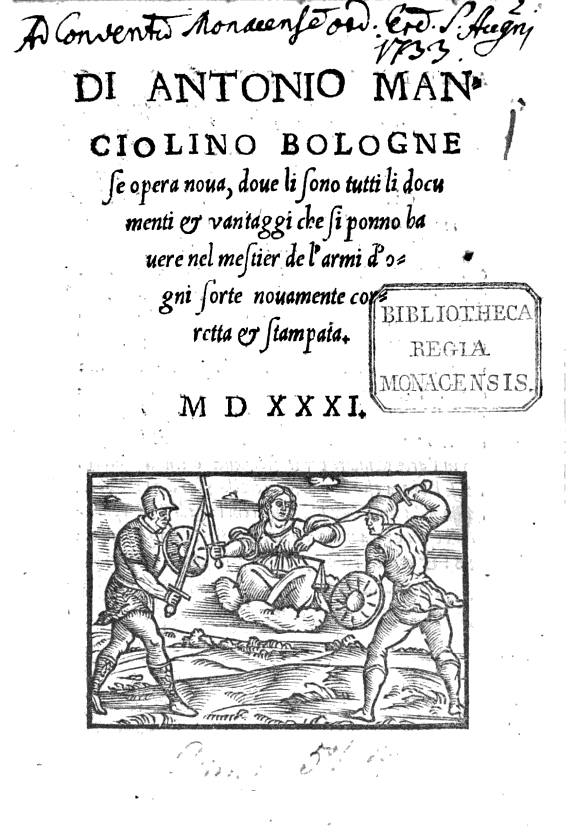
Cover of Opera Nova

Antonio Francesco Manciolino (... - ...; fl. 1518-1531) is considered one of the most important masters of the so-called "Bolognese School" of fencing.

There is very little biographical information about Antonio Francesco Manciolino: on November 24, 1518 he signed a contract for the publication of one thousand copies of his treatise on fencing with the Roman printer Stefano Guillery, committing to pay for the books two months after delivery; no other trace of this edition remains.

== Opera Nova ==
In 1531 in Venice, a treatise was printed under his name entitled Opera Nova per Imparare a Combattere, & Schermire d'ogni forte Armi, considered one of the major fencing works of the sixteenth century, consisting of six books and a prologue. It is possible that the work had been prepared almost a decade earlier, and that it was not Manciolino who printed it.

In the Opera Nuova there are several types of combat for the duel between two contenders. The largest part is dedicated to the combat of sword and buckler as in the treatise of the contemporary Achille Marozzo, since this discipline remains the cornerstone of the teaching of ancient fencing, at least until the mid-sixteenth century, especially of Bolognese fencing. In the remaining part of the treatise there are teachings of sword, sword and dagger, sword and cape, sword and cape two against two, sword and rotella, sword and broad buckler or targe, billhook, partisan, picca, and others.

== Bibliography ==
- Manciolino, Antonio; Battistini, Alessandro; Rubboli, Marco (2008). Opera nova. Rimini: Il cerchio. ISBN 978-88-8474-176-9.
- Tassinari, Paolo (2021). La Spada e il Brocchiere secondo la tradizione della Scuola Bolognese: Antonio Manciolino. Napoli: Accademia Nazionale di Scherma. ISBN 979-12-80230-13-3.

== See also ==
- Historical European Martial Arts
- Achille Marozzo
