= Bolognese Swordsmanship =

Historical swordsmanship tradition

Bolognese Swordsmanship, also sometimes known as the Dardi school, is a tradition within the Italian school of swordsmanship which is based on the surviving fencing treatises published by several 16th century fencing masters of Bologna, As early as the 14th century several fencing masters were living and teaching in the city: a maestro Rosolino in 1338, a maestro Nerio in 1354, and a maestro Francesco in 1385.

== Overview ==
The Dardi school is named after Lippo Bartolomeo Dardi, a professor of mathematics and astronomy at the University of Bologna, who was licensed as a fencing master and founded a fencing school in Bologna in 1415, just a few years after Fiore dei Liberi had completed his Fior di Battaglia. The Dardi School constituted both the last great medieval Western martial arts tradition as well as the first great Renaissance tradition, embracing both armed and unarmed combat. No manuscript ascribed to Dardi himself survives, although his tradition became the foundation for the work of Antonio Francesco Manciolino and Achille Marozzo, both possibly students of famed Bolognese master Guido Antonio de Luca.

The Bolognese masters whose treatises have survived shared a greater consistency of style, terminology and pedagogy with each other than with fencing masters of the period from other parts of Italy, thus justifying their treatment as a single school. The Dardi school focused primarily the single-handed spada da lato (side-sword) still used for both cutting and thrusting. The side-sword was used in combination with various defensive weapons, including a shield (brocchiero, rotella or targa), a dagger, a gauntlet or a cape. The two-handed sword or spadone was also still taught, although losing its prominence. In addition, instruction on fighting with the poleaxe and other polearms was given.

== Sources ==
A treatise on the gintilissima arte del schirmire ("most noble art of fencing") by a "Bolognese anonymous" (Anonimo Bolognese) was edited by Rubboli and Cesari (2005). It is dated to the "very first years of the 1500s" by the editors, but others have placed it closer to 1550. It is a compilation preserved in a single manuscript version (in two parts), mss. 345/6 of the Biblioteca Classense in Ravenna.

The Opera Nova of Antonio Manciolino was apparently first published in the early 1520s, but only a copy of the likely second edition, "newly revised and printed" in 1531, has survived. It was dedicated to Luis Fernández de Córdoba, Duke of Sessa (d. 1526), mentioned as imperial ambassador to Pope Adrian VI (r. 1522/23).

Opera Nova dell'arte delle armi ("New Treatise on the Art of Arms") by Achille Marozzo was published in 1536 in Modena, dedicated to Count Rangoni. Considered the most important work on Italian fencing of the 16th century, it exemplifies techniques about fighting in a judicial duel with all the major weapons of the times and includes a large section on the conventions and rules of the duel.

Angelo Viggiani's Lo Schermo was written around 1550 and published posthumously, ca. 1575.

Giovanni dall'Agocchie, Dell'Arte di Scrimia, 1572. This work is unusually clear, a significant amount of material on the theory of swordsmanship along with many specific descriptions of the fundamentals.

Girolamo Cavalcabo (Hieronyme Calvacabo, Hieronimo Cavalcabo) was trained in the Bolognese school of fencing, possibly under Angelo Viggiani dal Montone, and seems to have traveled to London, England in the 1580s or 1590s. While in London, he wrote a treatise on the use of the rapier entitled Nobilissimo discorso intorno il schermo ("Most Noble Discourse on Defense"), published in 1597. In the early 17th century, he served as fencing master at the court of Henry IV to Louis the Dauphin, later Louis XIII.
