= Achille Marozzo =

Italian fencer

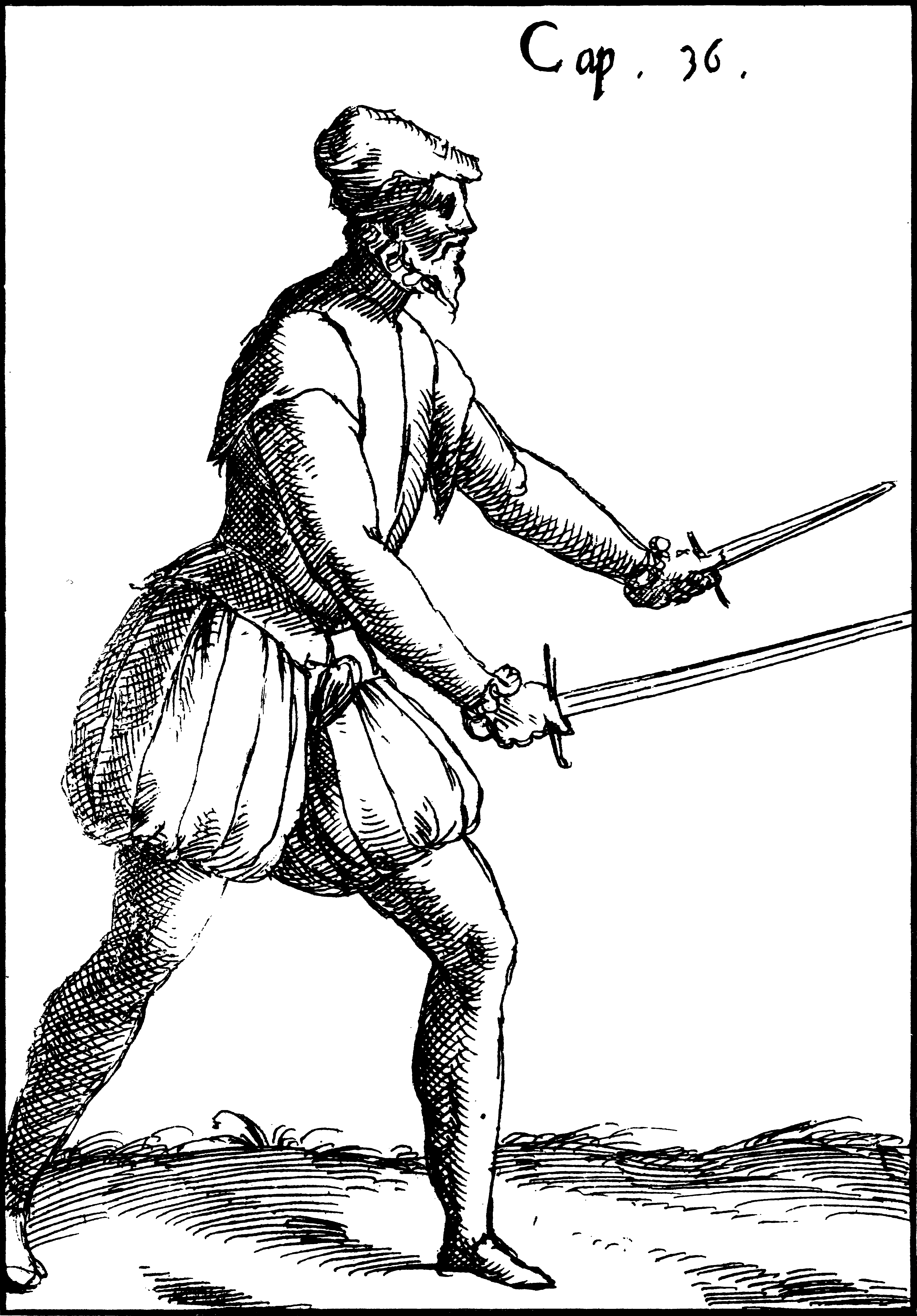

Achille Marozzo (1484–1553) was an Italian fencing master, one of the most important teachers in the Dardi or Bolognese tradition.

Marozzo was probably born in Bologna. His text Opera Nova dell'Arte delle Armi (roughly equivalent to "The New Text on the Art of Arms") was published in 1536 in Modena, dedicated to Count Rangoni, then reprinted several times all the way into the next century. It is considered one of the most important works about fencing in the 16th century. It exemplifies theory, sequences and techniques about combat with different weapons, such as:

- Sword and Small Buckler
- Sword and Broad Buckler
- Sword and Targa
- Sword and Dagger
- Sword and Cape
- Sword-Alone
- Sword and Rotella
- Large Dagger with and without Cape
- Sword for Two Hands
- Polearms (Lance, Ronca, Spetum, and Partisan)
- Unarmed against Dagger

He also includes a fairly comprehensive treatise on judicial dueling customs in Italy. The text was originally embellished with woodcuts, while after the 1568 edition, copperplate engravings were used.

Achille Marozzo states he studied swordsmanship under Guido Antonio Di Luca, about whom he says that "as many warriors came out of his school as did out of the Trojan horse". Later Bolognese fencing masters such as Viggiani and Dall'Agocchie may have been influenced by his work, if not directly studied under him.

Today, Marozzo's work is studied and researched by several historical fencing groups in different countries.

== See also ==
- Bolognese Swordsmanship
- Italian school of swordsmanship
