= Giovanni Dall'Agocchie =

Italian fencer

Giovanni Dall'Agocchie was an Italian fencer and author who published a fencing manual titled Dell'Arte di Scrima Libri Tre ("Three Books on the Art of Defense") in 1572.
