= Blade =

Sharp cutting part of a weapon or tool

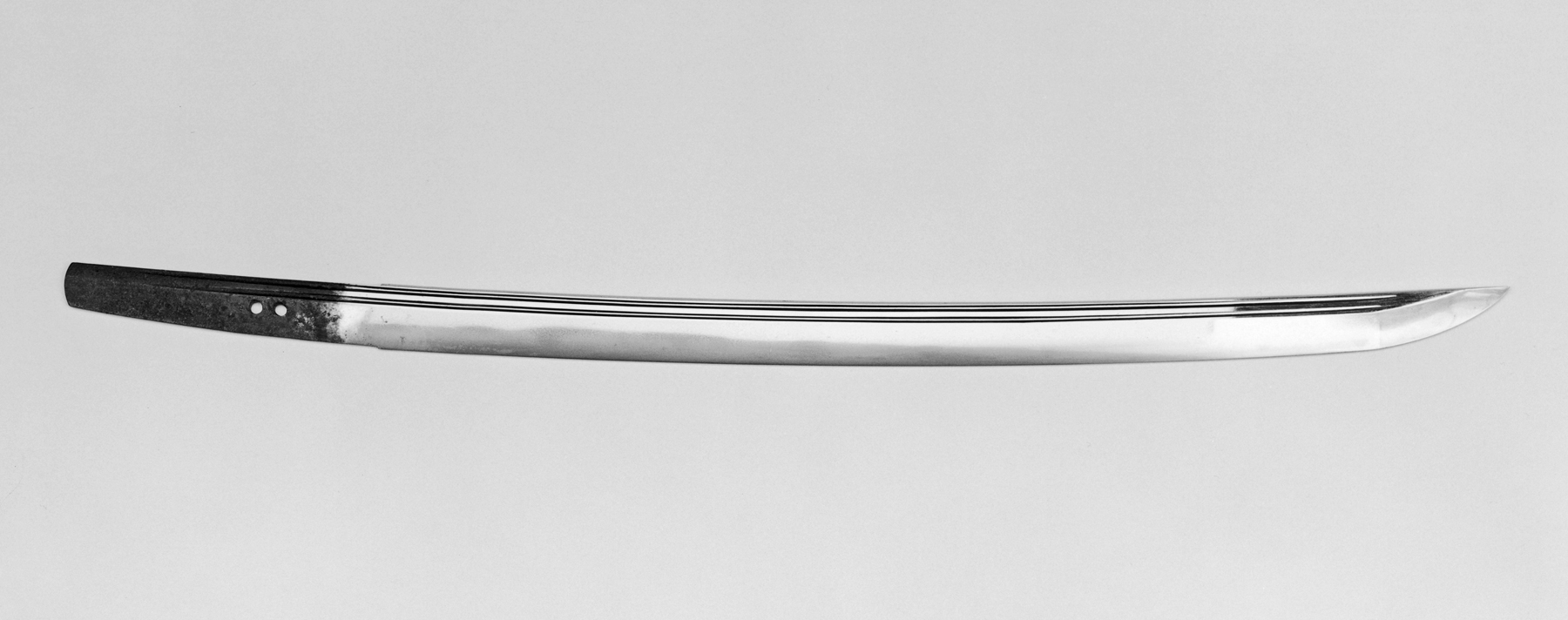
The exposed blade and tang of a Japanese sword without the hilt

A blade is the sharp, cutting portion of a tool, weapon, or machine, specifically designed to puncture, chop, slice, or scrape surfaces or materials. Blades are typically made from materials that are harder than those they are intended to cut. This includes early examples made from flaked stones like flint or obsidian, evolving through the ages into metal forms like copper, bronze, and iron, and culminating in modern versions made from steel or ceramics. Serving as one of humanity's oldest tools, blades continue to have wide-ranging applications, including in combat, cooking, and various other everyday and specialized tasks.

Blades function by concentrating force at the cutting edge. Design variations, such as serrated edges found on bread knives and saws, serve to enhance this force concentration, adapting blades for specific functions and materials. Blades thus hold a significant place both historically and in contemporary society, reflecting an evolution in material technology and utility.

== Uses ==
During food preparation, knives are mainly used for slicing, chopping, and piercing.

In combat, a blade may be used to slash or puncture, and may also be thrown or otherwise propelled. The function is to sever a nerve, muscle or tendon fibers, or blood vessel to disable or kill the adversary. Severing a major blood vessel typically leads to death due to exsanguination.

Blades may be used to scrape, moving the blade sideways across a surface, as in an ink eraser, rather than along or through a surface. For construction equipment such as a grader, the ground-working implement is also referred to as the blade, typically with a replaceable cutting edge.

== Physics ==
A simple blade intended for cutting has two faces that meet at an edge. Ideally, this edge would have no roundness but in practice, all edges can be seen to be rounded to some degree under magnification either optically or with an electron microscope. Force is applied to the blade, either from the handle or pressing on the back of the blade. The handle or back of the blade has a large area compared to the fine edge. This concentration of applied force onto the small edge area increases the pressure exerted by the edge. It is this high pressure that allows a blade to cut through a material by breaking the bonds between the molecules, crystals, fibers, etc. in the material. This necessitates the blade being strong enough to resist breaking before the other material gives way.

=== Geometry ===
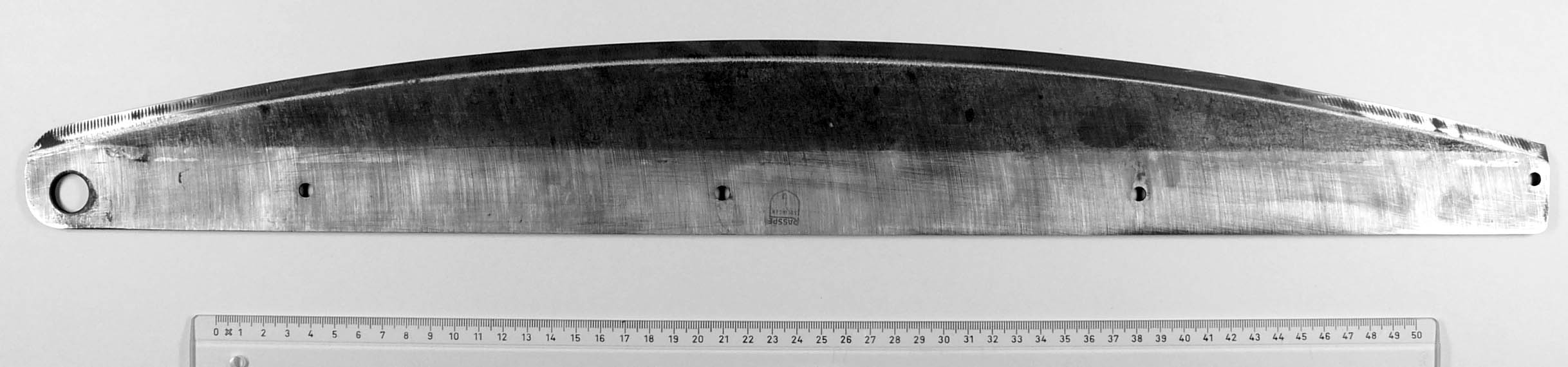
Blade of a whale knife

The angle at which the faces meet is important as a larger angle will make for a duller blade while making the edge stronger. A stronger edge is less likely to dull from fracture or have the edge roll out of shape.

The shape of the blade is also important. A thicker blade will be heavier and stronger and stiffer than a thinner one of similar design while also making it experience more drag while slicing or piercing. A filleting knife will be thin enough to be very flexible while a carving knife will be thicker and stiffer; a dagger will be thin so it can pierce, while a camping knife will be thicker so it can be stronger and more durable. A strongly curved edge, like a talwar, will allow the user to draw the edge of the blade against an opponent even while close to the opponent where a straight sword would be more difficult to pull in the same fashion. The curved edge of an axe means that only a small length of the edge will initially strike the tree, concentrating force as does a thinner edge, whereas a straight edge could potentially land with the full length of its edge against a flat section of the tree. A splitting maul has a convex section to avoid getting stuck in the wood where chopping axes can be flat or even concave. A khopesh, falchion, or kukri is angled and/or weighted at the distal end so that force is concentrated at the faster moving, heavier part of the blade maximizing cutting power and making it largely unsuitable for thrusting, whereas a rapier is thin and tapered allowing it to pierce and be moved with more agility while reducing its chopping power compared to a similarly sized sword.

A serrated edge, such as on a saw or a bread knife, concentrates force onto the tips of the serrations which increases pressure as well as allowing soft or fibrous material (like wood, rope, bread, and vegetables) to expand into the spaces between serrations. Whereas pushing any knife, even a bread knife, down onto a bread loaf will just squash the loaf as bread has a low elastic modulus (is soft) but high yield strain (loosely, can be stretched or squashed by a large proportion without breaking), drawing serrations across the loaf with little downward force will allow each serration to simultaneously cut the bread with much less deformation of the loaf. Similarly, pushing on a rope tends to squash the rope while drawing serrations across it sheers the rope fibers. Drawing a smooth blade is less effective as the blade is parallel to the direction draw but the serrations of a serrated blade are at an angle to the fibers. Serrations on knives are often symmetric allowing the blade to cut on both the forward and reverse strokes of a cut, a notable exception being Veff serrations which are designed to maximize cutting power while moving the blade away from the user. Saw blade serrations, for both wood and metal, are typically asymmetrical so that they cut while moving in only one direction. (Saws act by abrading a material into dust along a narrow channel, the kerf, whereas knives and similar act by forcing the material apart. This means that saws result in a loss of material and the serrations of a saw also serve to carry metal swarf and sawdust out of the cut channel.)

Fullers are longitudinal channels either forged into the blade or later machined/milled out of the blade though the latter process is less desirable. This loss of material necessarily weakens the blade but serves to make the blade lighter without sacrificing stiffness. The same principle is applied in the manufacture of beams such as I-beams. Fullers are only of significant utility in swords. In most knives there is so little material removed by the fuller that it makes little difference to the weight of the blade and they are largely cosmetic.

=== Materials ===
Typically blades are made from a material that is about as hard, though usually harder, than the material to be cut. Insufficiently hard blades will be unable to cut a material or will wear away quickly as hardness is related to a material's ability to resist abrasion. However, blades must also be tough enough to resist the dynamic load of impact and as a general rule the harder a blade the less tough (the more brittle) a material. For example, a steel axehead is much harder than the wood it is intended to cut and is sufficiently tough to resist the impact resulting when swung against a tree while a ceramic kitchen knife, harder than steel, is very brittle (has low toughness) and can easily shatter if dropped onto the floor or twisted while inside the food it is cutting or carelessly stored under other kitchen utensils. This creates a tension between the intended use of the blade, the material it is to be made from, and any manufacturing processes (such as heat treatment in the case of steel blades that will affect a blade's hardness and toughness). A balance must be found between the sharpness and how well it can last. Methods that can circumvent this include differential hardening. This method yields an edge that can hold its sharpness as well as a body that is tough.

==== Non-metals ====
Prehistorically, and in less technologically advanced cultures even into modern times, tool and weapon blades have been made from wood, bone, and stone. Most woods are exceptionally poor at holding edges and bone and stone suffer from brittleness making them suffer from fracture when striking or struck. In modern times stone, in the form of obsidian, is used in some medical scalpels as it is capable of being formed into an exceedingly fine edge. Ceramic knives are non-metallic and non-magnetic. As non-metals do not corrode they remain rust and corrosion free but they suffer from similar faults as stone and bone, being rather brittle and almost entirely inflexible. They are harder than metal knives and so more difficult to sharpen, and some ceramic knives may be as hard or harder than some sharpening stones. For example, synthetic sapphire is harder than natural sharpening stones and is as hard as alumina sharpening stones. Zirconium dioxide is also harder than garnet sharpening stones and is nearly as hard as alumina. Both require diamond stones or silicon carbide stones to sharpen and care has to be taken to avoid chipping the blade. As such ceramic knives are seldom used outside of a kitchen and they are still quite uncommon. Plastic knives are difficult to make sharp and poorly retain an edge. They are largely used as low cost, disposable utensils or as children's utensils or in environments such as air travel where metal blades are prohibited. They are often serrated to compensate for their general lack of sharpness but, as evidenced by the fact they can cut food, they are still capable of inflicting injury. Plastic blades of designs other than disposable cutlery are prohibited or restricted in some jurisdictions as they are undetectable by metal detectors.

==== Metals ====
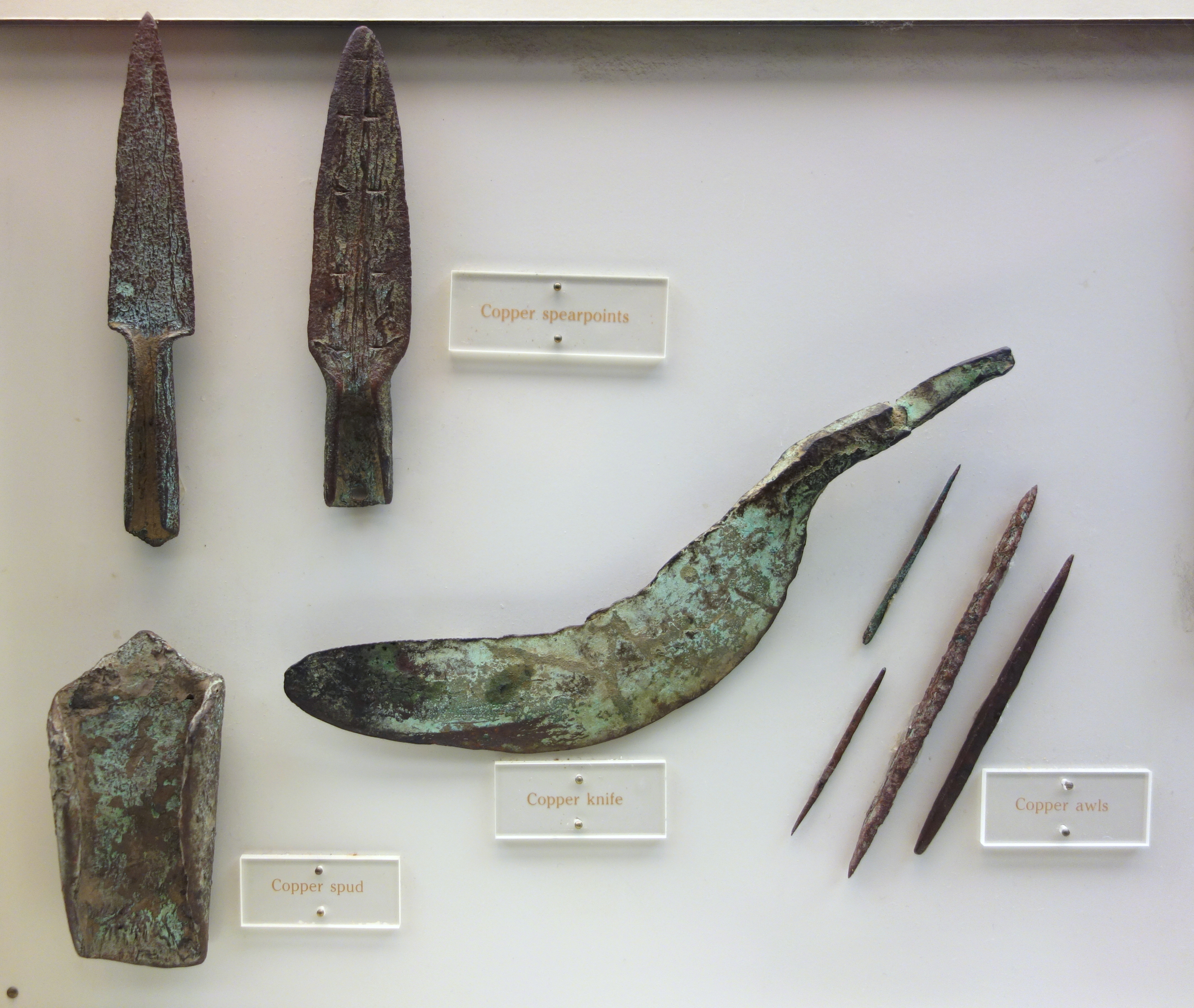
Copper knife - Late Archaic period, Wisconsin, 3000 BC-1000 BCE.

Native copper was used to make blades by ancient civilizations due to its availability. Copper's comparative softness causes it to deform easily; it does not hold an edge well and is poorly suited for working stone. Bronze is superior in this regard, and was taken up by later civilizations. Both bronze and copper can be work hardened by hitting the metal with a hammer. With technological advancement in smelting, iron came to be used in the manufacturing of blades. Steel, a range of alloys made from iron, has become the metal of choice for the modern age.

Various alloys of steel can be made which offer a wide range of physical and chemical properties desirable for blades. For example, surgical scalpels are often made of stainless steel so that they remain free of rust and largely chemically inert; tool steels are hard and impact resistant (and often expensive as retaining toughness and hardness requires expensive alloying materials, and, being hard, they are difficult to make into their finished shape) and some are designed to resist changes to their physical properties at high temperatures. Steels can be further heat treated to optimize their toughness, which is important for impact blades, or their hardness, which allows them to retain an edge well with use (although harder metals require more effort to sharpen).

==== Combined materials and heat-treatments ====
It is possible to combine different materials, or different heat treatments, to produce desirable qualities in a blade. For example, the finest Japanese swords were routinely made of up to seven sections of metals and even poorer quality swords were often made of two. These would include soft irons that could absorb the energy of impact without fracturing but which would bend and poorly retain an edge, and hard steels more liable to shatter on impact but which retained an edge well. The combination provided a sword that would resist impact while remaining sharp, even though the edge could chip if abused. Pattern welding involved forging together twisted bars of soft (bendable) low carbon and hard (brittle) higher carbon iron. This was done because furnaces of the time were typically able to produce only one grade or the other, and neither was well suited for more than a very limited use blade. The ability of modern steelmakers to produce very high-quality steels of various compositions has largely relegated this technique to either historical recreations or to artistic works. Acid etching and polishing blades made of different grades of steel can be used to produce decorative or artistic effects.

Japanese sword makers developed the technique of differential hardening by covering their sword blades in different thicknesses of clay before quenching. Thinner clay allowed the heated metal to cool faster, particularly along the edge. Faster cooling resulted in a finer crystal structure, resulting in a blade with a hard edge but a more flexible body. European sword makers produced similar results using differential tempering.

=== Dulling ===
Blades dull with use and abuse. This is particularly true of acute blades and those made of soft materials. Dulling usually occurs due to contact between the blade and a hard substance such as ceramic, stone, bone, glass, or metal.

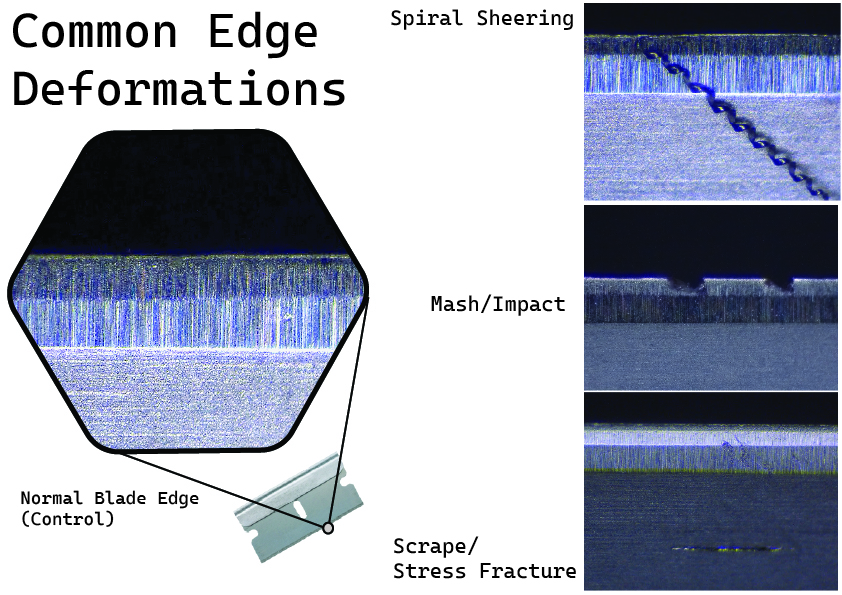
The figure illustrates four common blade deformations that can occur due to use or misuse. Images captured using a stereo microscope.

The more acute the blade, the more easily it will dull. As the blade near the edge is thinner, there is little material to remove before the edge is worn away to a thicker section. Thin edges can also roll over when force is applied it them, forming a section like the bottom part of a letter "J". For this reason, straight edge razors are frequently stropped to straighten the edge.

Drawing a blade across any material tends to abrade both the blade, usually making it duller, and the cut material. Though softer than glass or many types of stone used in the kitchen, steel edges can still scratch these surfaces. The resulting scratch is full of very fine particles of ground glass or stone which will very quickly abrade the blade's edge and so dull it.

In times when swords were regularly used in warfare, they required frequent sharpening because of dulling from contact with rigid armor, mail, metal rimmed shields, or other swords, for example. Particularly, hitting the edge of another sword by accident or in an emergency could chip away metal and even cause cracks through the blade. Soft-cored blades are more resistant to fracturing on impact.

=== Nail pulls ===
Folding pocket knives often have a groove cut in the side of the blade near the spine. This is called a nail pull and allows the fingernail to be inserted to swing the blade out of the holder.

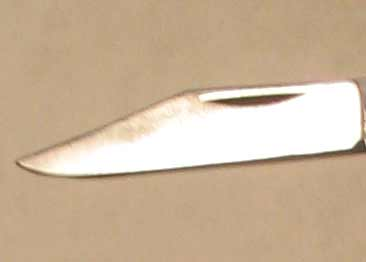
Blade with a nail pull

== Knife patterns ==
Blade styles with typical edges shown as dark grey

Some of the most common shapes are listed below.

S1
A straight back blade, also called standard or normal, has a curving edge and a straight back. A dull back lets the wielder use fingers to concentrate force; it also makes the knife heavy and strong for its size. The curve concentrates force on a smaller area, making cutting easier. This knife can chop as well as pick and slice. This is also the best single-edged blade shape for thrusting, as the edge cuts a swath that the entire width of the knife can pass through without the spine having to push aside any material on its path, as a sheepsfoot or drop-point knife would.

S2
A trailing-point knife has a back edge that curves upward to end above the spine. This lets a lightweight knife have a larger curve on its edge and indeed the whole of the knife may be curved. Such a knife is optimized for slicing or slashing. Trailing point blades provide a larger cutting area, or belly, and are common on skinning knives.

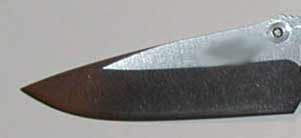
Drop-point blade

S3
A drop point blade has a convex curve of the back towards the point. It handles much like the clip-point, though with a stronger point typically less suitable for piercing. Swiss army pocket knives often have drop-points on their larger blades.

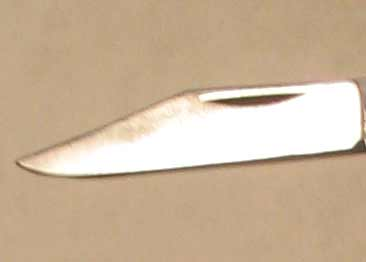
Clip-point blade

S4
A clip-point blade is like a normal blade with the back "clipped". This clip can be either straight or concave. The back edge of the clip may have a false edge that could be sharpened to make a second edge. The sharp tip is useful as a pick, or for cutting in tight places. If the false edge is sharpened it increases the knife's effectiveness in piercing. As well, having the tip closer to the center of the blade allows greater control in piercing. The Bowie knife has a clip point blade and clip-points are common on pocket knives and other folding knives.

S5
A sheepsfoot blade has a straightedge and a straight dull back that curves towards the edge at the end. It gives the most control because the dull back edge is made to be held by fingers. Sheepsfoot blades were originally made to trim the hooves of sheep; their shape bears no similarity to the foot of a sheep.

S6
A Wharncliffe blade is similar in profile to a sheep's foot but the curve of the back edge starts closer to the handle and is more gradual. Its blade is much thicker than a knife of comparable size. Wharncliffes were used by sailors, as the shape of the tip prevented accidental penetration of the work or the user's hand with the sudden motion of a ship.

S7
A spey point blade (once used for neutering livestock) has a single, sharp, straight edge that curves strongly upwards at the end to meet a short, dull, straight point from the dull back. With the curved end of the blade being closer to perpendicular to the blade's axis than other knives and lacking a point, making penetration unlikely, spey blades are common on Trapper style pocket knives for skinning fur-bearing animals.

Blade styles with typical edges shown as dark grey

C1
Leaf blade with a distinctive recurved "waist" adding some curved "belly" to the knife facilitating slicing as well as shifting weight towards the tip meaning that it is commonly used for throwing knives as well as improving chopping ability.

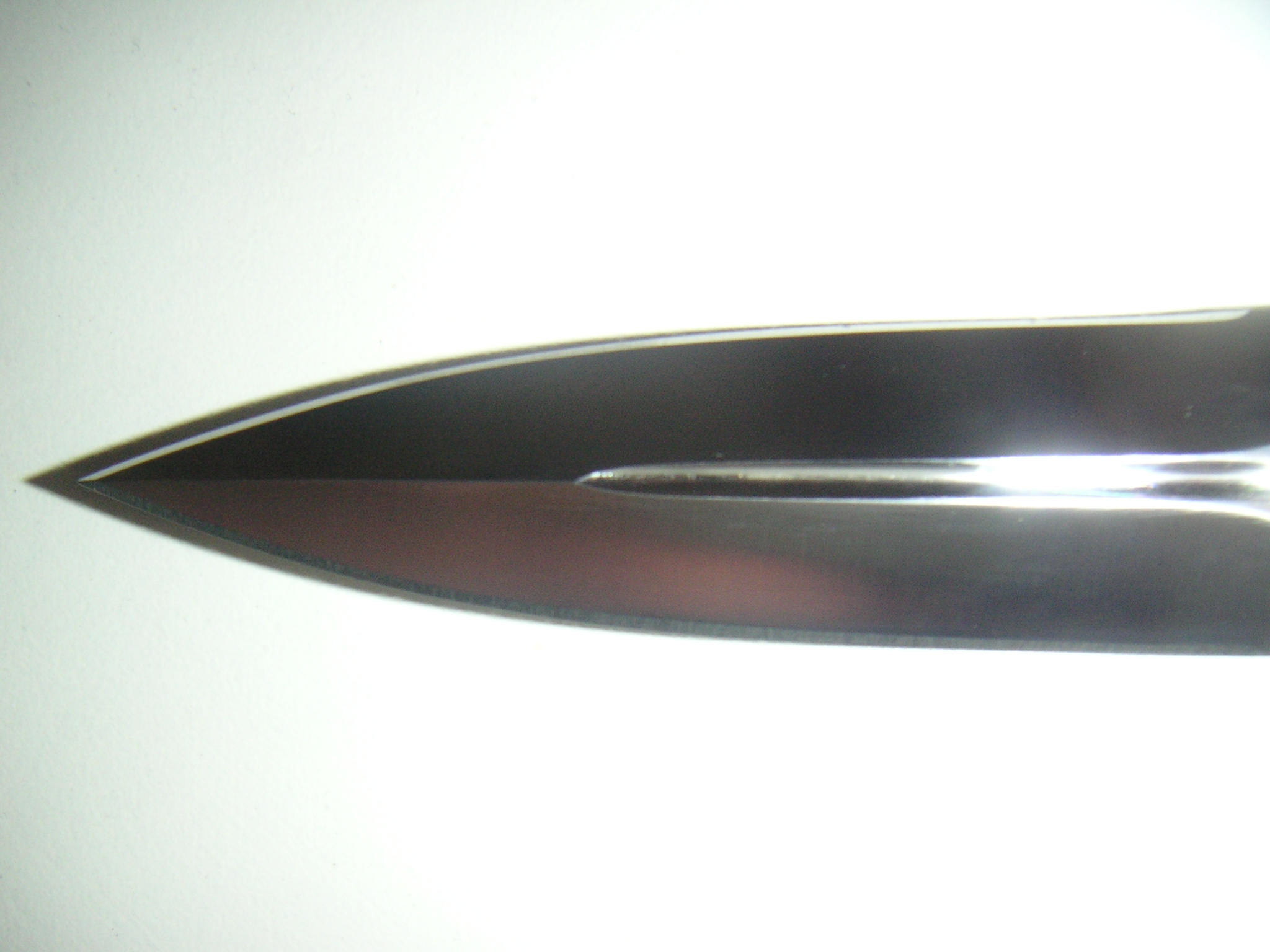
Spear-point blade

C2
A spear point blade is a symmetrically-shaped blade with a point aligned with the centerline of the blade's long axis. True spear-point blades are double-edged with a central spine, like a dagger or spear head. The spear point is one of the stronger blade point designs in terms of penetration stress, and is found on many thrusting knives such as the dagger. The term spear point is occasionally and confusingly used to describe small single-edged blades without a central spine, such as that of the pen knife, a small folding-blade pocket knife formerly used in sharpening quills for writing. Pen-knife may also nowadays refer to a knifelike weapon blade pattern of some of larger pocket knife blades that would otherwise be termed drop-point designs.

C3
A needle point blade has a sharply-tapered acuminated point. It is frequently found on daggers such as the stiletto (which had no sharpened edges) and the Fairbairn–Sykes fighting knife. Its long, narrow point reduces friction and increases the blade's penetrative capabilities, but is liable to stick in bone and can break if abused. When the needle point is combined with a reinforced 'T' section running the length of the blade's spine, it is called a reinforced tip. One example of a knife with a reinforced tip is the pesh-kabz.

C4
Kris or flame-bladed sword. These blades have a distinct recurved blade form and are sharpened on both sides, typically tapering to (or approximating) a symmetrical point.

C5
Referred to in English speaking countries as a "tanto" or "tanto point"— a corruption of the Japanese word tantō, despite the tip bearing no resemblance to a tantō — or as a chisel point, referring to the straightness of the edge that comprises the end of the blade (and not to be confused with a blade said to have a "chisel grind", which would refer to a blade ground on only one side, even though chisels can be ground on one or both sides). It is similar to, but not the same as, some early Japanese swords that had kamasu kissaki ("barracuda tip"), a nearly straight edge at the tip whereas the typical "tanto point" as found in the west has a straight edge. The barracuda tip sword was sharp but also fragile whereas modern tanto points are often advertised as being stronger at the tip for having nearly the whole thickness of the blade present until quite close to the end of the knife. The geometry of the angle under the point gives tanto blades excellent penetration capabilities. For this reason, tanto blades are often found on knives designed for combat or fighting applications, where the user may need to pierce heavy clothing or low-level soft body armor. With a modified tanto, the end is clipped and often sharpened. This brings the tip closer to the center of the blade increasing control of the blade and improves penetration potential by having a finer point and a sharpened back edge.

C6
A hawkbill blade is sharpened on the inside edge and is similar to carpet and linoleum knives. The point will tear even if the rest of the knife is comparatively dull. The karambit from Far South-East Asia is a hawkbill knife which is held with the blade extending from the bottom of the fist and the tip facing forward. The outside edge of a karambit may be sharp and if so may also feature a backward-facing point.

C7
An ulu (lit. 'woman's knife' in Inuktitut) knife is a sharpened segment of a circle. This blade type has no point, and has a handle in the middle. It is good for scraping and sometimes chopping. The semi-circular version appears elsewhere in the world and is called a head knife. It is used in leatherworking both to scrape down leather (reducing thickness, i.e. skiving), and to make precise, rolling cuts for shapes other than straight lines. The circular version is a popular tool for slicing pizzas. One corner is placed at the edge of the pizza and the blade is rolled across in a diameter cut.

== Sword patterns ==
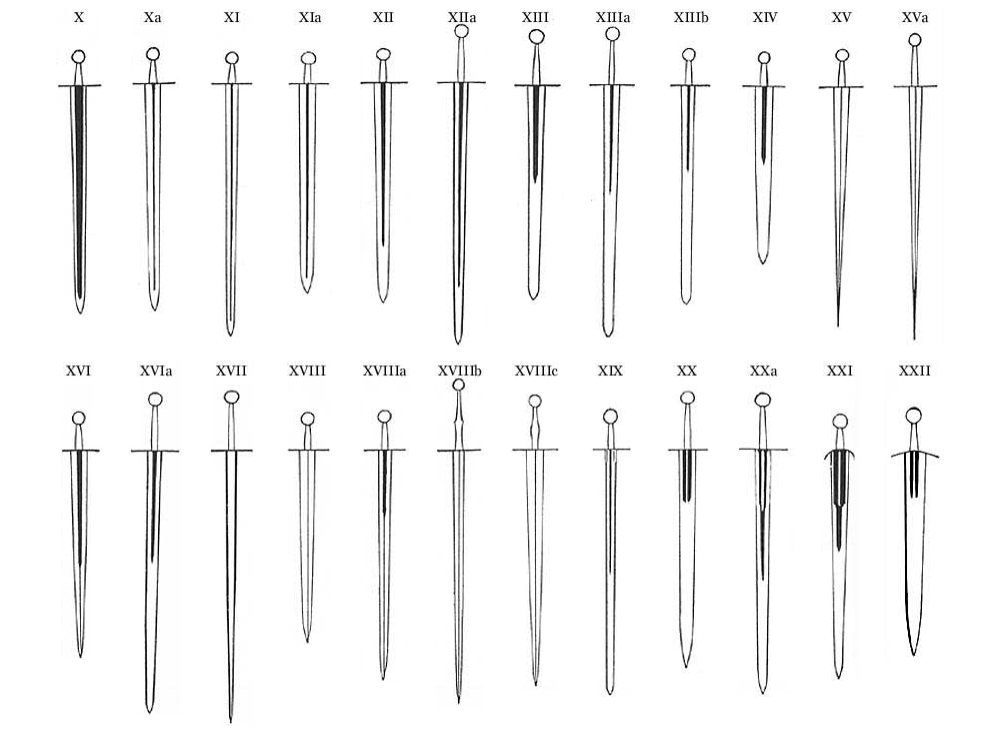
The Oakeshott typology categorizes knightly swords by their shape.

The sharp edges of a sword may be either curved or straight. Curved blades tend to glide more easily through soft materials, making these weapons more ideal for slicing. Techniques for such weapons feature drawing the blade across the opponent's body and back. For straight-edged weapons, many recorded techniques feature cleaving cuts, which deliver the power out to a point, striking directly in at the target's body, done to split flesh and bone rather than slice it. That being said, there also exist many historical slicing techniques for straight-edged weapons. Hacking cuts can be followed by a drawing action to maximize the cut's effectiveness. For more information see Western Martial Arts or kenjutsu.

Some weapons are made with only a single leading edge, such as the sabre or dusack. The dusack has a 'false edge' near the tip, which only extends down a portion of the blade's backside. Other weapons have a blade that is entirely dull except for a sharpened point, like the épée or foil, which prefer thrusts over cuts. A blade cannot perform a proper cut without an edge, and so in competitive fencing such attacks reward no points.

Some variations include:

- The flame blade (an undulated blade, for both psychological effect and some tactical advantage of using a non-standard blade: vibrations and easier parry)
- The colichemarde, found in smallsword

== Marks and decoration ==
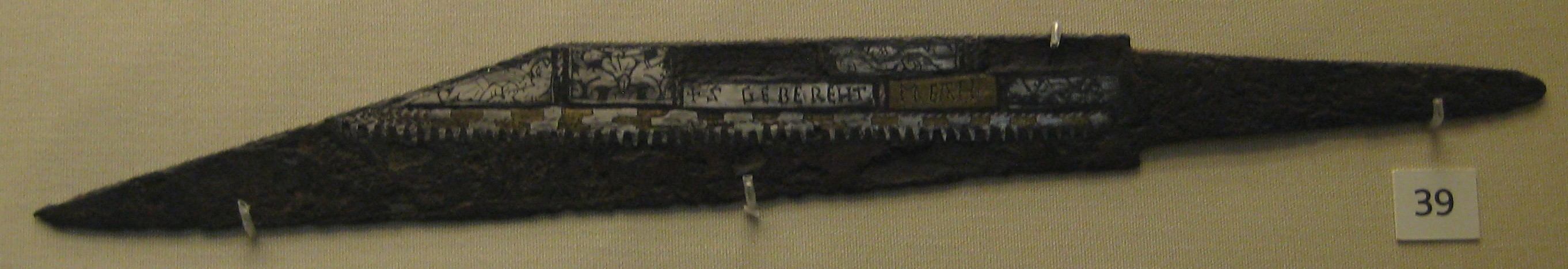
An Anglo-Saxon "broken-back" seax from Sittingbourne in Kent, inscribed in Insular majuscules ☩ BIORHTELM ME ÞORTE ("Biorhtelm made me") and ☩ S[I]GEBEREHT ME AH ("S[i]gebereht owns me").

Blades are sometimes marked or inscribed, for decorative purposes, or with the mark of either the maker or the owner. Blade decorations are often realized in inlay in some precious metal (gold or silver).

Early blade inscriptions are known from the Bronze Age, a Hittite sword found at Hattusa bears an inscription chiseled into the bronze, stating that the blade was deposited as an offering to the storm-god by king Tuthaliya.

Blade inscriptions become particularly popular in the 12th century knightly sword, based on the earlier, 9th to 11th century, the tradition of the so-called Ulfberht swords.

Blade marks can also have meanings. Guild marks are an example. Swords made in cities controlled by guilds might bear the guild's mark, indicating adherence to quality standards or a specific style associated with the guild. Researching guild markings of the period can shed light on the sword's origin and potential quality.

== See also ==
- Athamé
