= Flamberg =

Flamberg may refer to:

- Flame-bladed sword, a style of blade
- Alexander Flamberg, a Polish chess master
