= Colichemarde =

Type of small sword

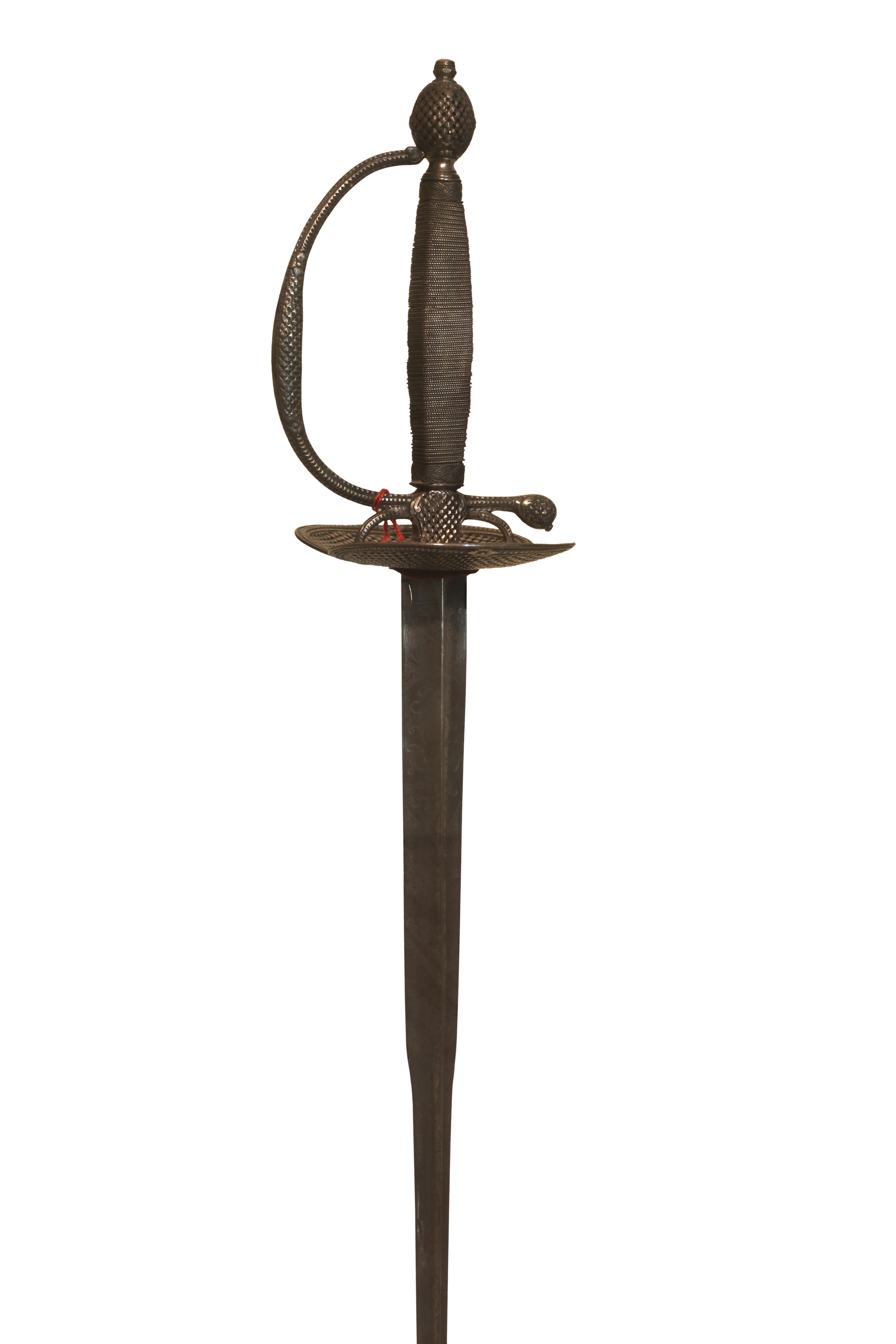
Colichemarde smallsword with a silver guard, 18th century. The abrupt narrowing of the blade, the defining feature of the colichemarde, is visible. Vevey historical museum.

Colichemarde is a type of small sword (often written "smallsword") blade that was popular from the late 17th to the mid-18th century.

== Overview ==
The small sword is considered to be a descendant of the "transitional rapier", which itself evolved from the rapier due to the demand for a lighter sword, easier to wear. The shape of a colichemarde blade features a wide forte, which abruptly tapers to a much narrower form at a point varying between a fifth to a third of the blade length from the hilt. The blade cross section was most often triangular and hollow-ground. This configuration combines good parrying characteristics, due to the wide blade forte, with the good maneuverability and thrusting characteristics imparted by the narrow blade foible. Its lighter weight, shorter length and superior balance, compared to the rapier, allowed faster and more accurate movement of the blade. This enabled the fencer to achieve a more precisely targeted thrust on an adversary.

The point where the blade of a sword joins the tang was a recognized weak point. The tang was often made of malleable iron and forge-welded to the steel of the blade. A wider blade at this point of transition, such as is seen in the colichemarde, may have been viewed as offering a stronger union.

== Brief history ==
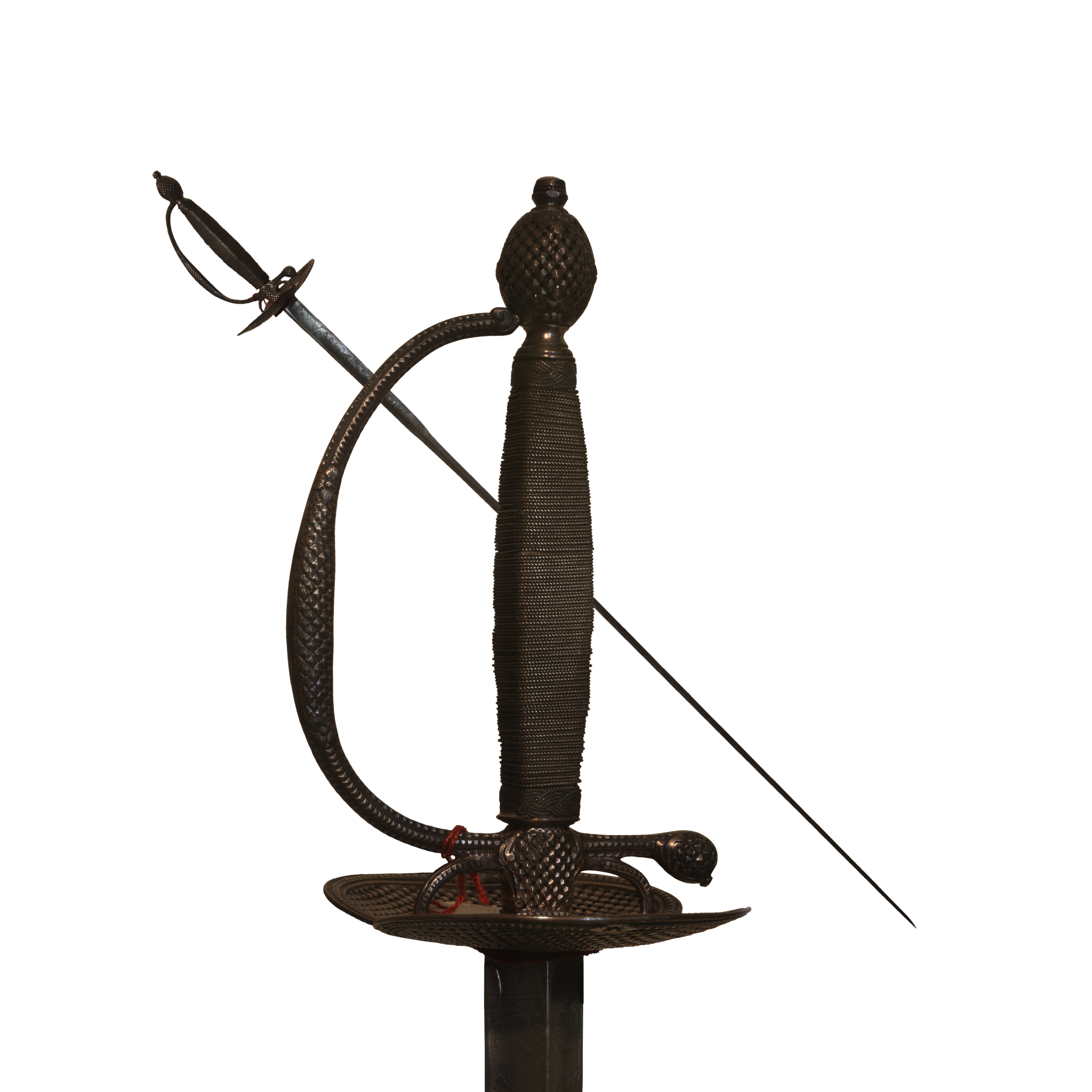
Two views of the same weapon.

The colichemarde blade configuration is sometimes credited to Graf von Königsmark (perhaps Otto Wilhelm Königsmarck), owing to the two names' similarity in pronunciation. The colichemarde appeared about 1680 and was popular during the next 40 years at the royal European courts. This sword appeared about the same time as the foil. However the foil was created for practicing fencing at court, while the colichemarde was intended for dueling. The widespread misapprehension that the colichemarde quickly ceased to be produced after 1720 dates to the opinion given by Sir Richard Burton in his Book of the Sword (1884). However, many securely dated colichemarde swords from as late as the 1770s can be found in collections. In fact, the colichemarde was popular during the Seven Years' War of 1756–1763.

Officers in North America favoured the colichemarde during the 1754–1763 conflict there, known in the United States as the French and Indian War. George Washington was presented with one during his inauguration as president of the US in 1789. Colichemardes were common in the duels of New Orleans.

== See also ==
- Sabre (fencing)
- Duel
- Rapier
- Small sword
- Flame-bladed sword
- Spada da lato
