= Rapier =

One-handed thrusting sword

Rapier/Espada ropera
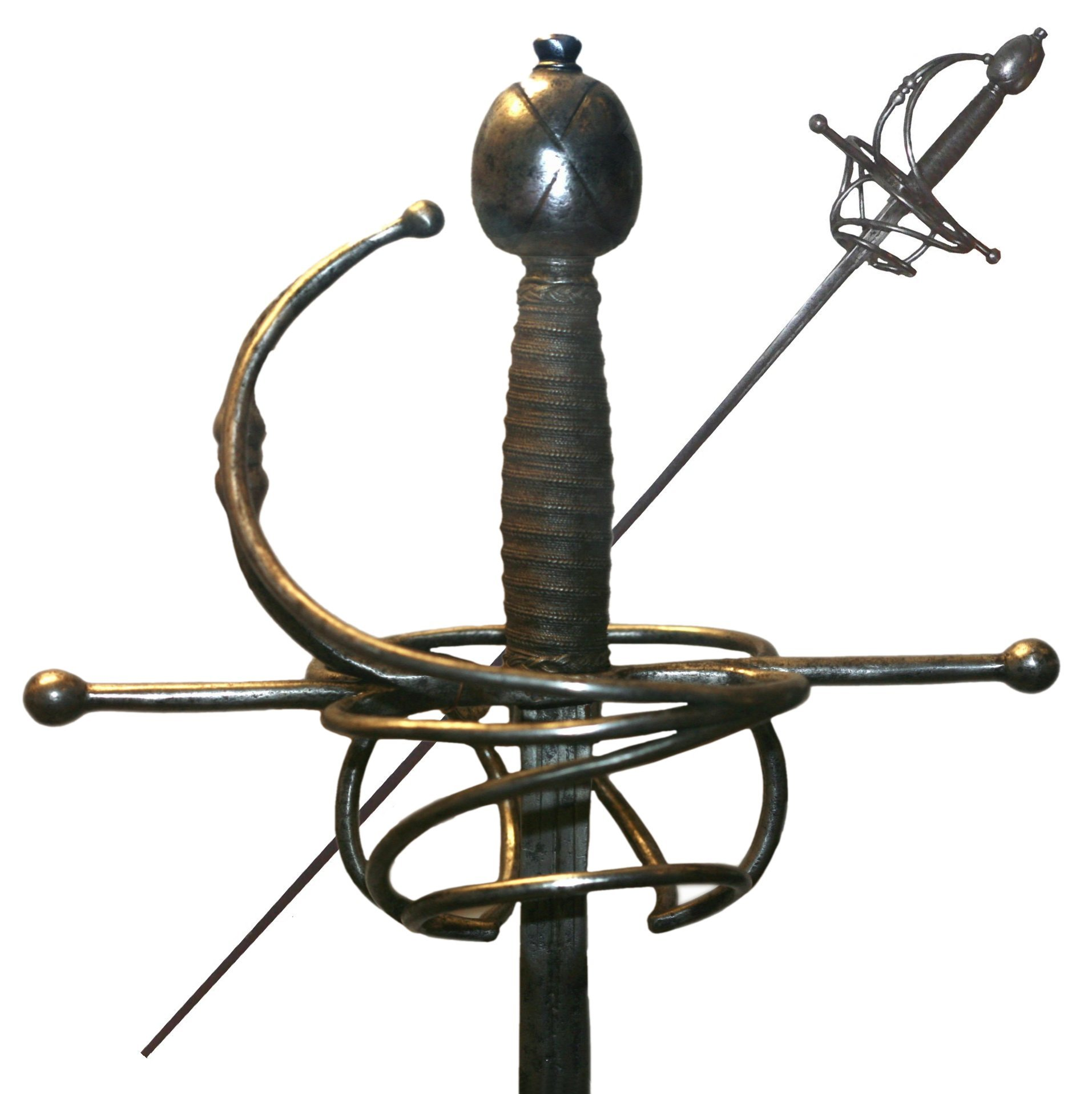
- Espada ropera, first half of the 17th century
- Type: Sword
- Place of origin: Spain (espada ropera) and Italy (spada da lato-striscia)

Production history
- Designed: Around c. 1540

Specifications
- Mass: Avg. 1 kg (2.2 lb)
- Blade length: Avg. 104 cm (41 in)
- Width: Avg. 2.5 cm (0.98 in) to sharp point
- Blade type: Single- or double-edged, straight blade
- Hilt type: Complex, protective hilt

A rapier (/ˈreɪpiər/) is a type of sword originally used in Spain (known as espada ropera, 'dress sword') and Italy (known as spada da lato a striscia). The name designates a sword with a straight, slender and sharply pointed two-edged long blade wielded in one hand. Known for its elegant design and intricate hilt, it was widely popular in Western Europe throughout the 16th and 17th centuries as a symbol of nobility or gentleman status.

As fencing spread throughout Western Europe, important sources for rapier fencing arose in Spain, known under the term destreza ("dexterity"), in Italy and France. The French small sword or court sword of the 18th century was a direct continuation of this tradition of fencing.

Rapier fencing forms part of Historical European Martial Arts. The rapier has also been widely used in theatrical productions and films. The Society of American Fight Directors recognizes rapier and dagger as one of the eight main weapon disciplines of stage combat.

== Terminology ==
The origin of the name 'rapier' is Spanish. It is called espada ropera because it was carried as an accessory to clothing, generally used for fashion and as a weapon for dueling, self-defense and as a military side arm. Its name is of Spanish origin and appears recorded for the first time in the Coplas de la panadera, by Juan de Mena, written approximately between 1445 and 1450:

Say, baker.
A Wednesday that left
Prince Enrique
to look for some good bite
for his espada ropera,
he left without another wait
from Olmedo such a great company,
that with very beautiful skill
to the Port was withdrawn.

The English term "rapier" comes from the French rapière and appears both in English and German, near-simultaneously, in the mid-16th century, for a light, long, pointed two-edged sword. It is a loan from Middle French espee rapiere, first recorded in 1474, a nickname meaning 'grater'.

The 16th-century German rappier described what was considered a foreign weapon, imported from Spain, Italy, and France. Du Cange in his Middle Latin dictionary cites a form Rapperia from a Latin text of 1511. He envisages a derivation from Greek ραπίζειν (rapízein) 'to strike'. Adelung in his 1798 dictionary records a double meaning for the German verb rappieren: 'to fence with rapiers' on one hand, and 'to rasp, grate (specifically of tobacco leaves)' on the other.

The terms used by the Spanish, Italian and French masters during the heyday of this weapon were simply the equivalent of "sword", i.e. espada, spada and épée (espée). When it was necessary to specify the type of sword the Spanish used espada ropera. The name was registered for the first time in las Coplas de la panadera, by Juan de Mena, written between 1445 and 1450 approximately.

Clements (1997) categorizes thrusting swords with poor cutting abilities as rapiers, and swords with both good thrusting and cutting abilities as cut-and-thrust swords.

The term "rapier" is also applied by archaeologists to an unrelated type of Bronze Age sword.

== Description ==
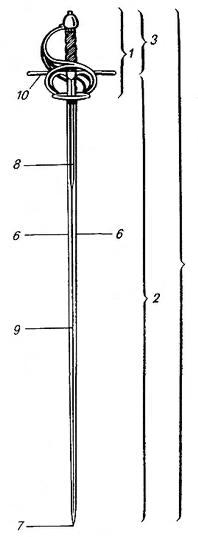

The word "rapier" generally refers to a relatively long-bladed sword characterized by a protective hilt which is constructed to provide protection for the hand wielding the sword. Some historical rapier samples also feature a broad blade mounted on a typical rapier hilt. The term rapier can be confusing because this hybrid weapon can be categorized as a type of broadsword. While the rapier blade might be broad enough to cut to some degree (but nowhere near that of the wider swords in use around the Middle Ages such as the longsword), it is designed to perform quick and nimble thrusting attacks. The blade might be sharpened along its entire length or sharpened only from the center to the tip (as described by Capoferro). Pallavicini, a rapier master in 1670, strongly advocated using a weapon with two cutting edges. A typical example would weigh 1 kilogram (2.2 lb) and have a relatively long and slender blade of 2.5 centimetres (0.98 inches) or less in width, 104 cm (41 in) or more in length and ending in a sharply pointed tip. The blade length of quite a few historical examples, particularly the Italian rapiers in the early 17th century, is well over 115 cm (45 in) and can even reach 130 cm (51 in).

The term rapier generally refers to a thrusting sword with a blade longer and thinner than that of the so-called side-sword but much heavier than the small sword, a lighter weapon that would follow in the 18th century and later, but the exact form of the blade and hilt often depends on who is writing and when. It can refer to earlier spada da lato and the similar espada ropera, through the high rapier period of the 17th century through the small sword and duelling swords; thus context is important in understanding what is meant by the word. (The term side-sword, used among some modern historical martial arts reconstructionists, is a translation from the Italian spada da lato—a term coined long after the fact by Italian museum curators—and does not refer to the slender, long rapier, but only to the early 16th-century Italian sword with a broader and shorter blade that is considered both its ancestor and contemporary.)

== Parts of the sword ==
=== Hilt ===
Rapiers often have complex, sweeping hilts designed to protect the hand wielding the sword. Rings extend forward from the crosspiece. In some later samples, rings are covered with metal plates, eventually evolving into the cup hilts of many later rapiers. There were hardly any samples that featured plates covering the rings prior to the 1600s. Many hilts include a knuckle bow extending down from the crosspiece protecting the grip, which was usually wood wrapped with cord, leather or wire. A large pommel (often decorated) secures the hilt to the weapon and provides some weight to balance the long blade.

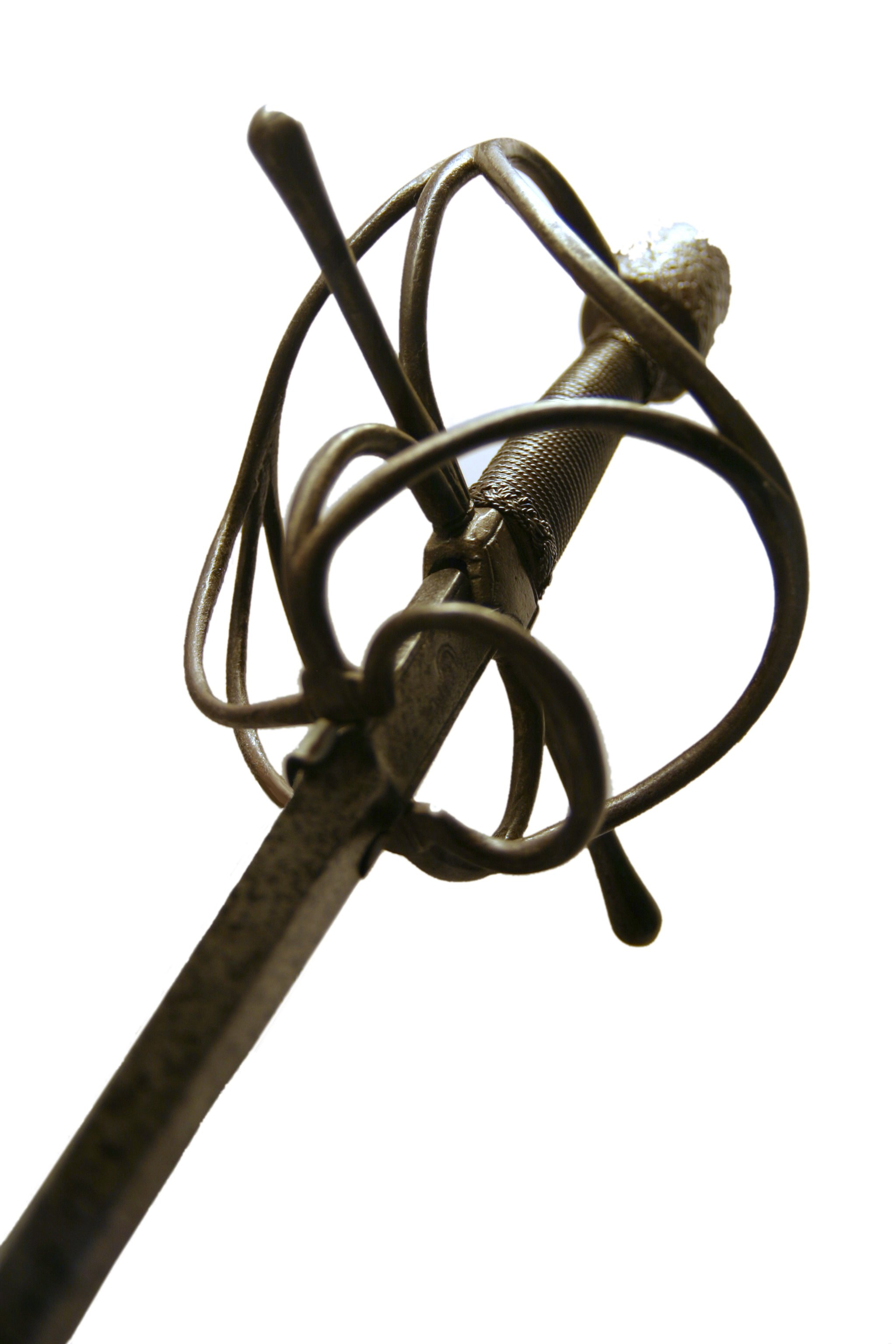

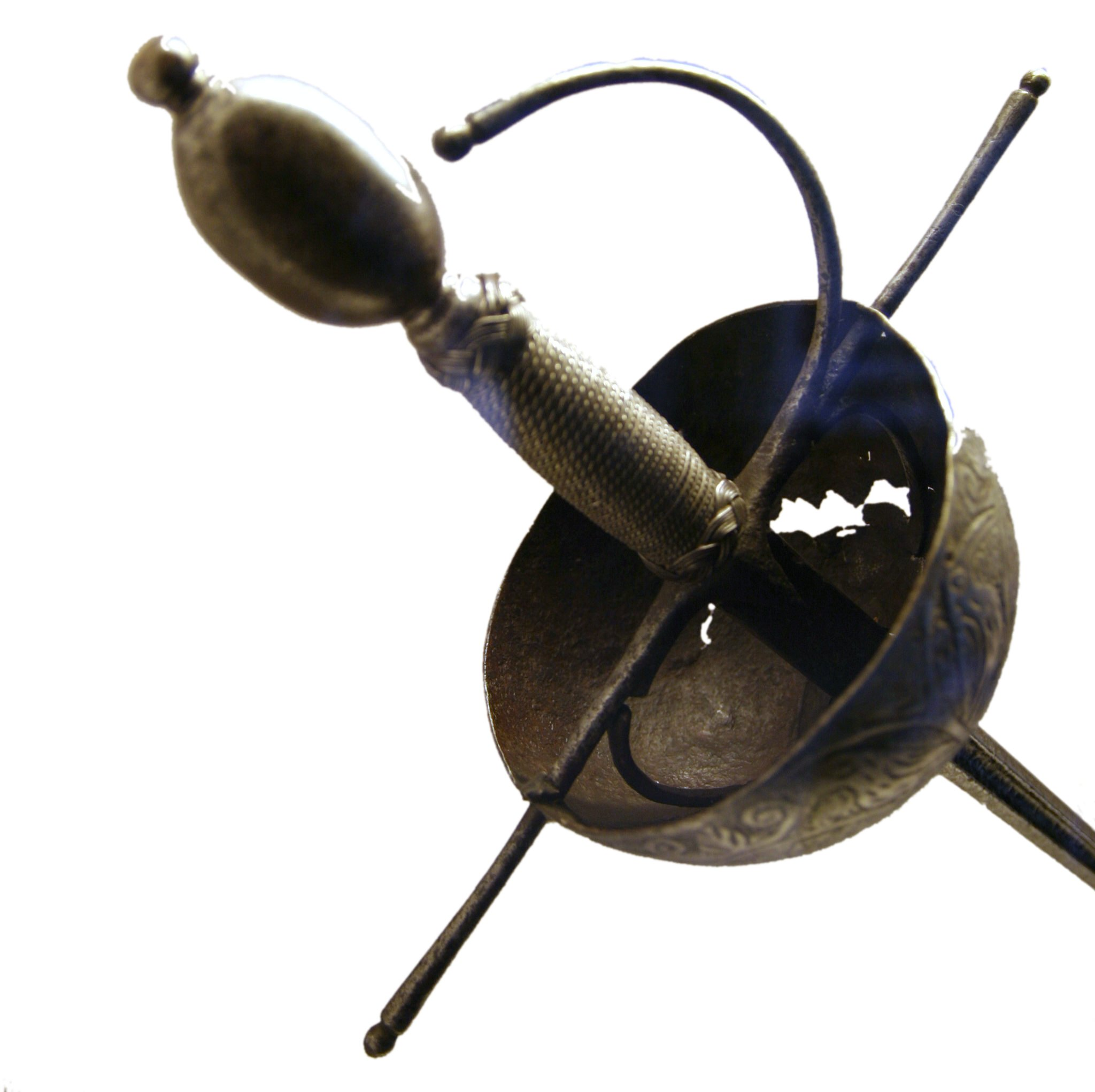

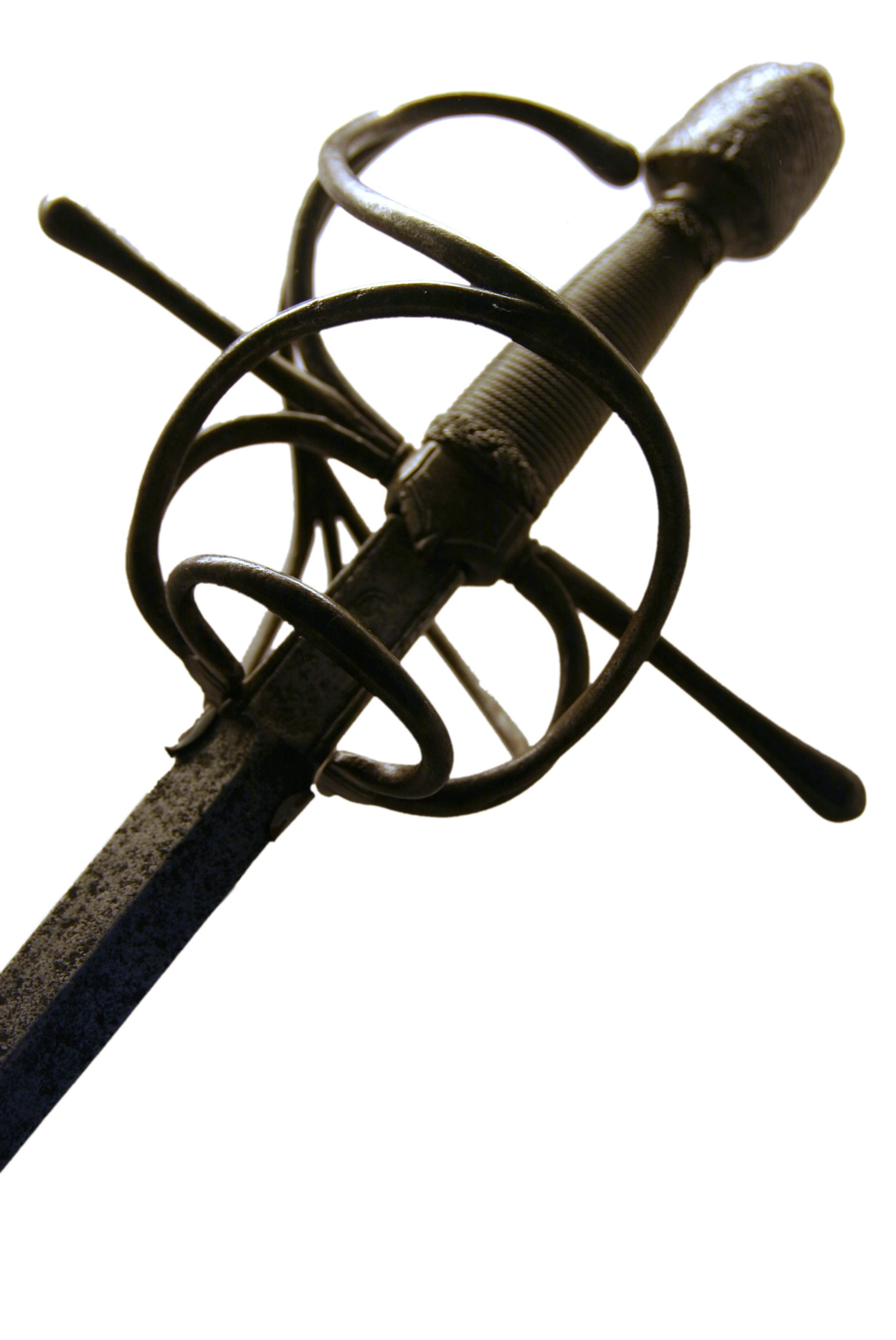

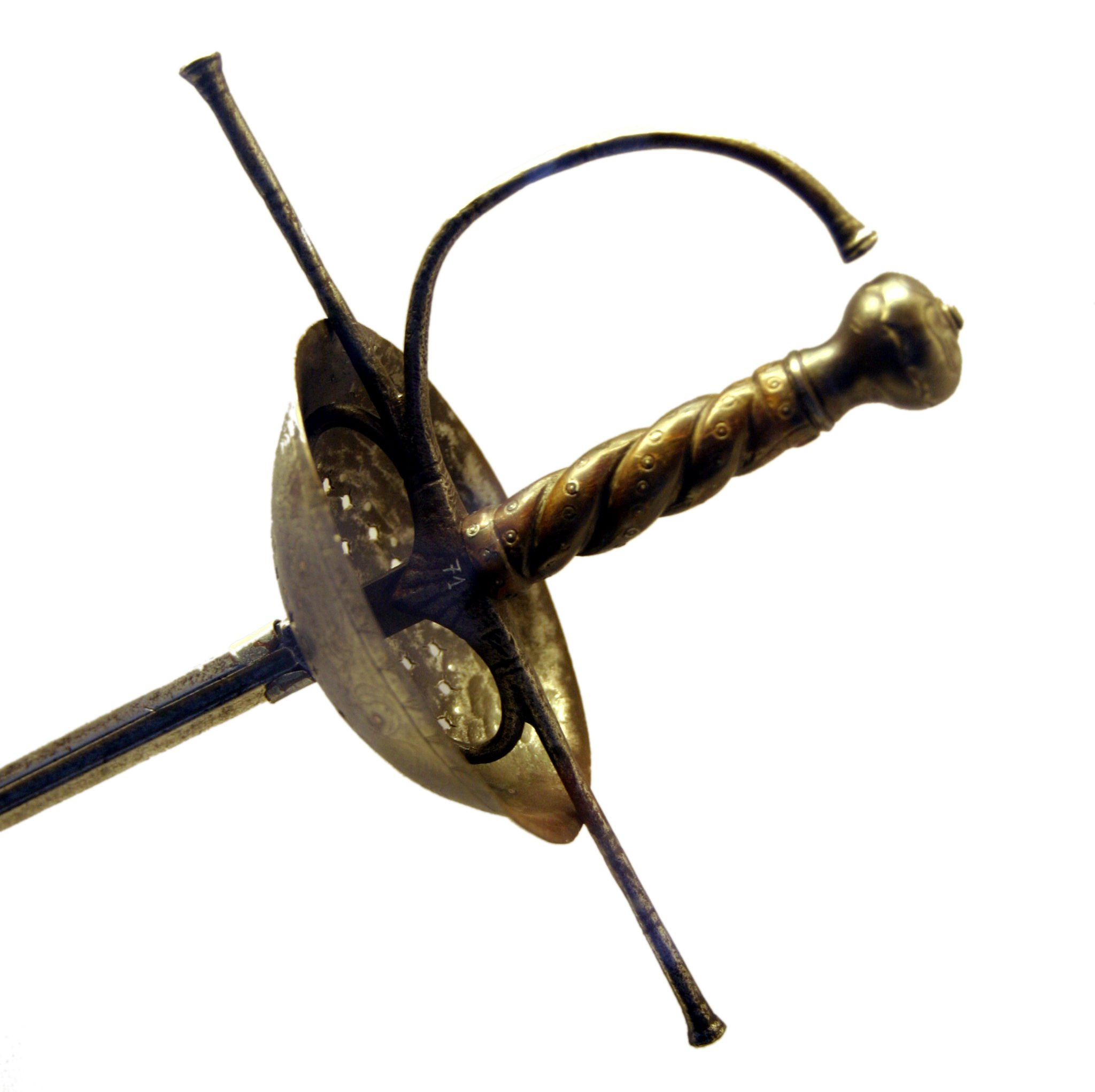

=== Blade ===
Various rapier masters divided the blade into two, three, four, five or even nine parts. The forte, strong, is that part of the blade closest to the hilt; in cases where a master divides the blade into an even number of parts, this is the first half of the blade. The debole, weak, is the part of the blade which includes the point and is the second half of the blade when the sword is divided into an even number of parts. However, some rapier masters divided the blade into three parts (or even a multiple of three), in which case the central third of the blade, between the forte and the debole, was often called the medio, mezzo or the terzo. Others used four divisions (Fabris) or even twelve (Thibault).

The forte of the blade is usually unsharpened, and often has a thick blunt edge to provide a strong parrying ability. However, a sharpened forte reduces the risk of the opponent grabbing hold of (grappling) the blade during a fight.

The ricasso is the rear portion of the blade, usually unsharpened. It extends forward from the crosspiece or quillion and then gradually integrates into the thinner and sharper portion of the blade.

=== Overall length ===
There was historical disagreement over how long the ideal rapier should be, with some masters, such as Thibault, denigrating those who recommended longer blades; Thibault's own recommended length was such that the cross of the sword be level with the navel (belly button) when standing naturally with the point resting on the ground. A small number of rapiers with extending blades were made, of which four survive in modern collections. The purpose of the ability is unclear, with suggestions including trying to gain the advantage of surprise in a duel or an attempt to get around laws limiting weapon length.

== Off-hand weapons ==
Rapiers are single-handed weapons and they were often employed with off-hand bucklers, daggers, cloaks and even second swords to assist with defense. A buckler is a small round shield that was used with other blades as well, such as the arming sword. Capo Ferro's Gran Simulacro depicts use of the weapon with the rotella, which is a significantly bigger shield compared with the buckler. Nevertheless, using the rapier with a parrying dagger is the most common practice, and it has been arguably considered as the most suited and effective accompanying weapon for the rapier.

Even though the slender blade of a rapier enables the user to launch a quick attack at a fairly long and advantaged distance between the user and the opponent, and the protective hilt can deflect the opponent's blade, the thrust-oriented weapon is weakened by its bated cutting power and relatively low maneuverability at a closer distance, where the opponent has safely passed the reach of the rapier's deadly point.

Therefore, some close-range protection for the user needs to be ensured if the user intends to use the rapier in an optimal way, especially when the opponent uses some slash-oriented sword like a sabre or a broadsword. A parrying dagger not only enables the users to defend in this scenario in which the rapier is not very good at protecting the user, but also enables them to attack in such close distance.

== History ==
The espada ropera of the 16th century was a cut-and-thrust civilian weapon for self-defense and the duel, while earlier weapons were equally at home on the battlefield. Throughout the 16th century, a variety of new, single-handed civilian weapons were being developed. In 1570, the Italian master Rocco Bonetti first settled in England advocating the use of the rapier for thrusting as opposed to cutting or slashing when engaged in a duel. Nevertheless, the English word "rapier" generally refers to a primarily thrusting weapon, developed by the year 1600 as a result of the geometrical theories of such masters as Camillo Agrippa, Ridolfo Capo Ferro, and Vincentio Saviolo.

The rapier became extremely fashionable throughout Europe with the wealthier classes, but was not without its detractors. Some people, such as George Silver, disapproved of its technical potential and the dueling use to which it was put.

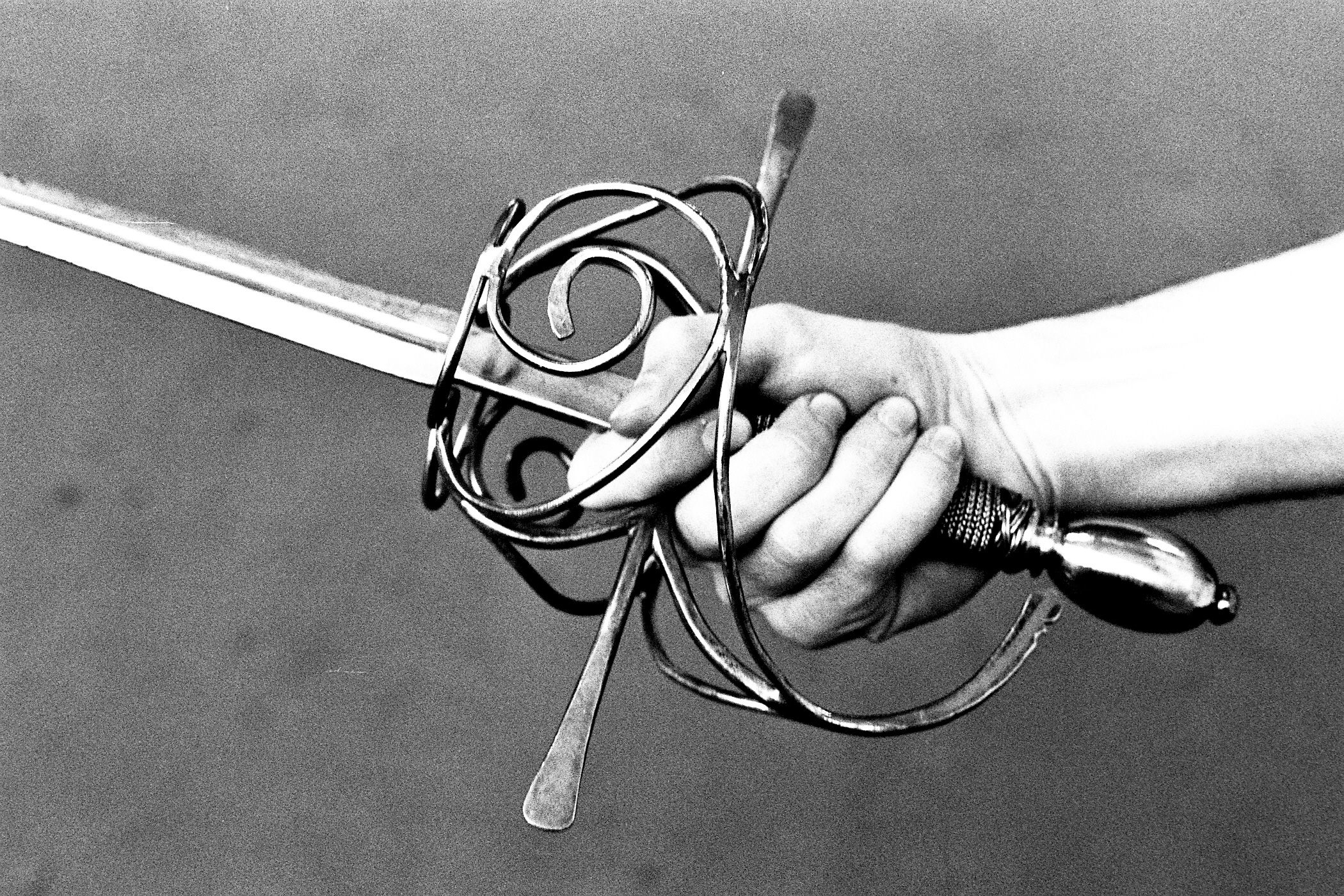
Swept hilt, an Italian fashion

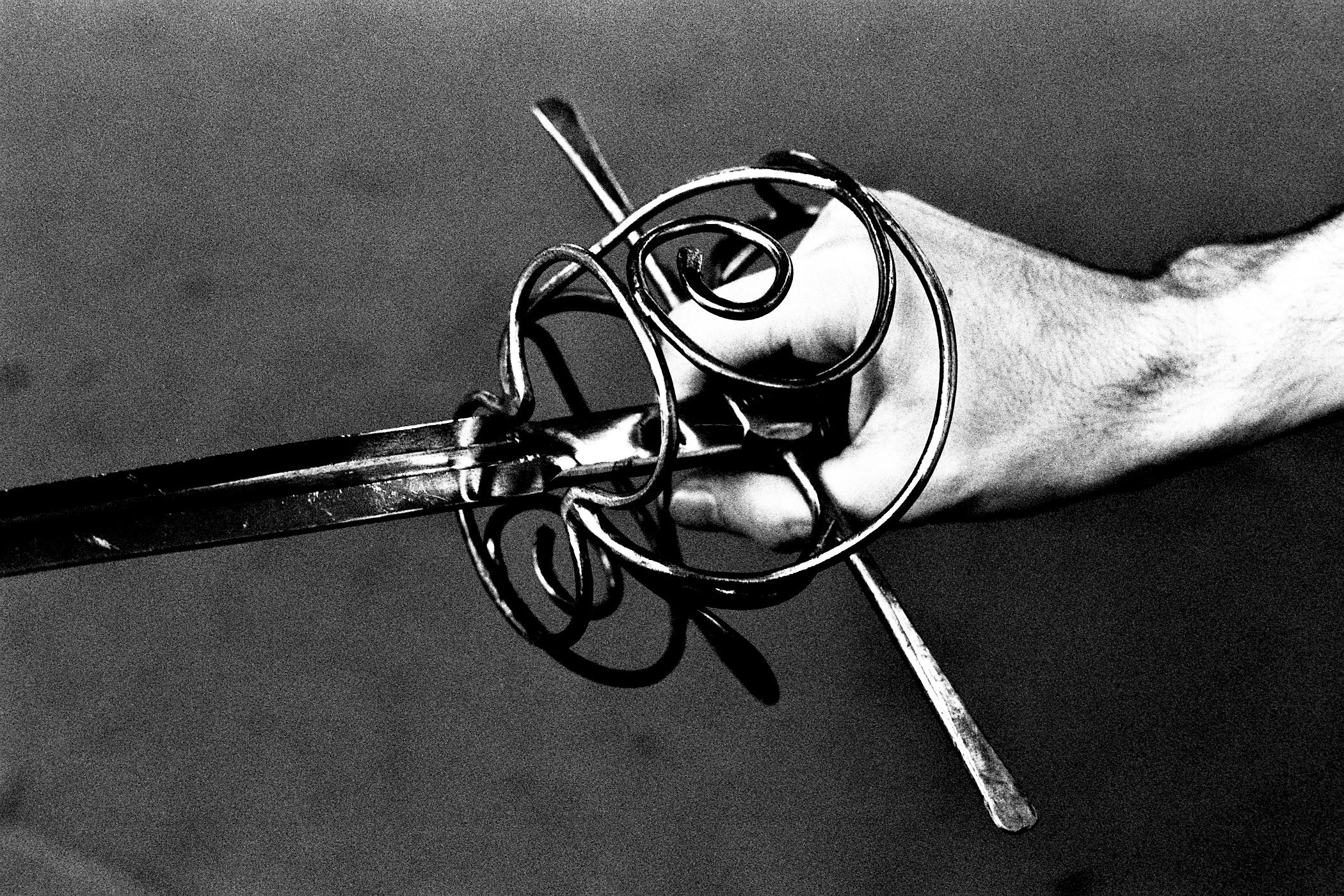
Swept hilt, an Italian fashion

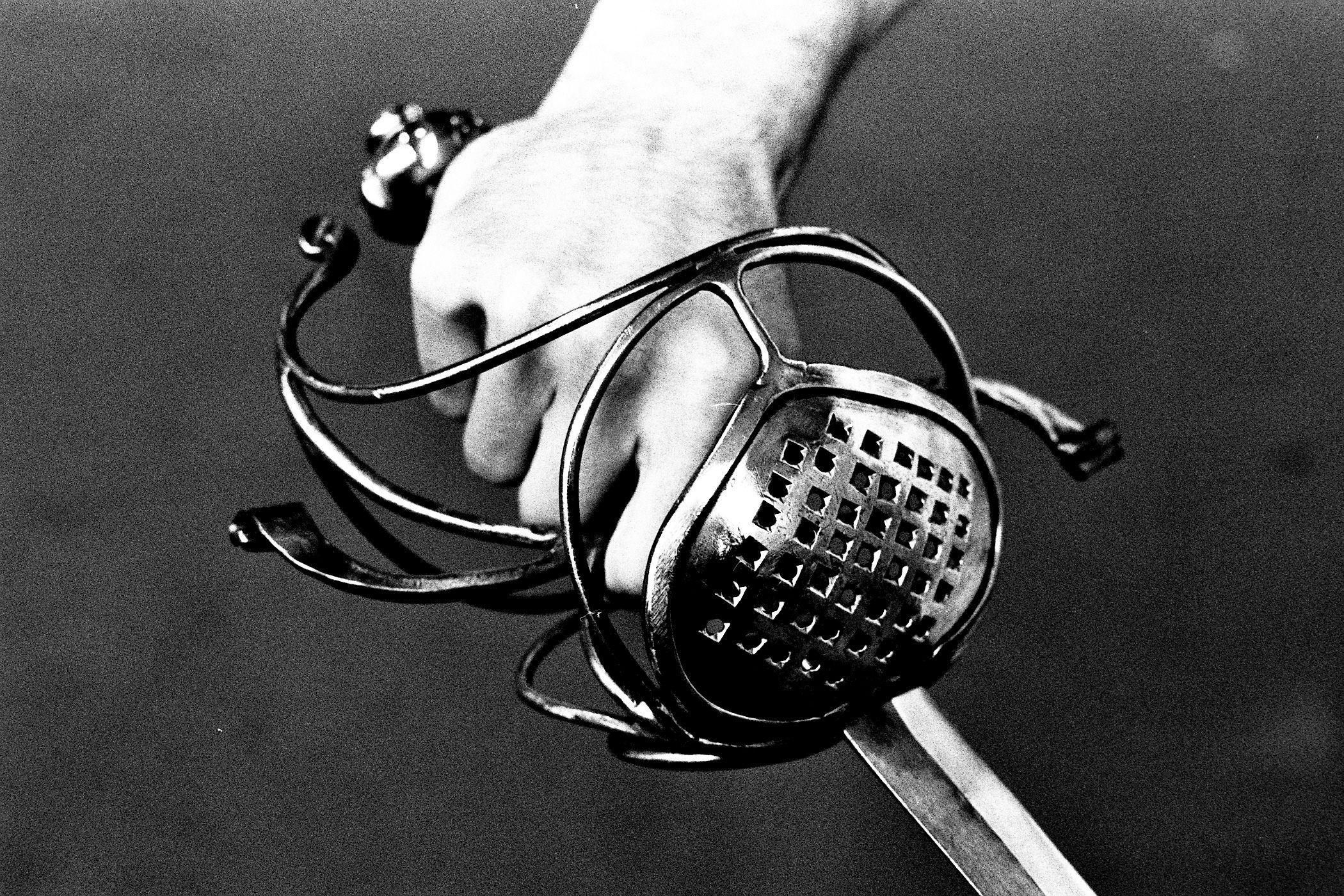
Pappenheimer, a German innovation

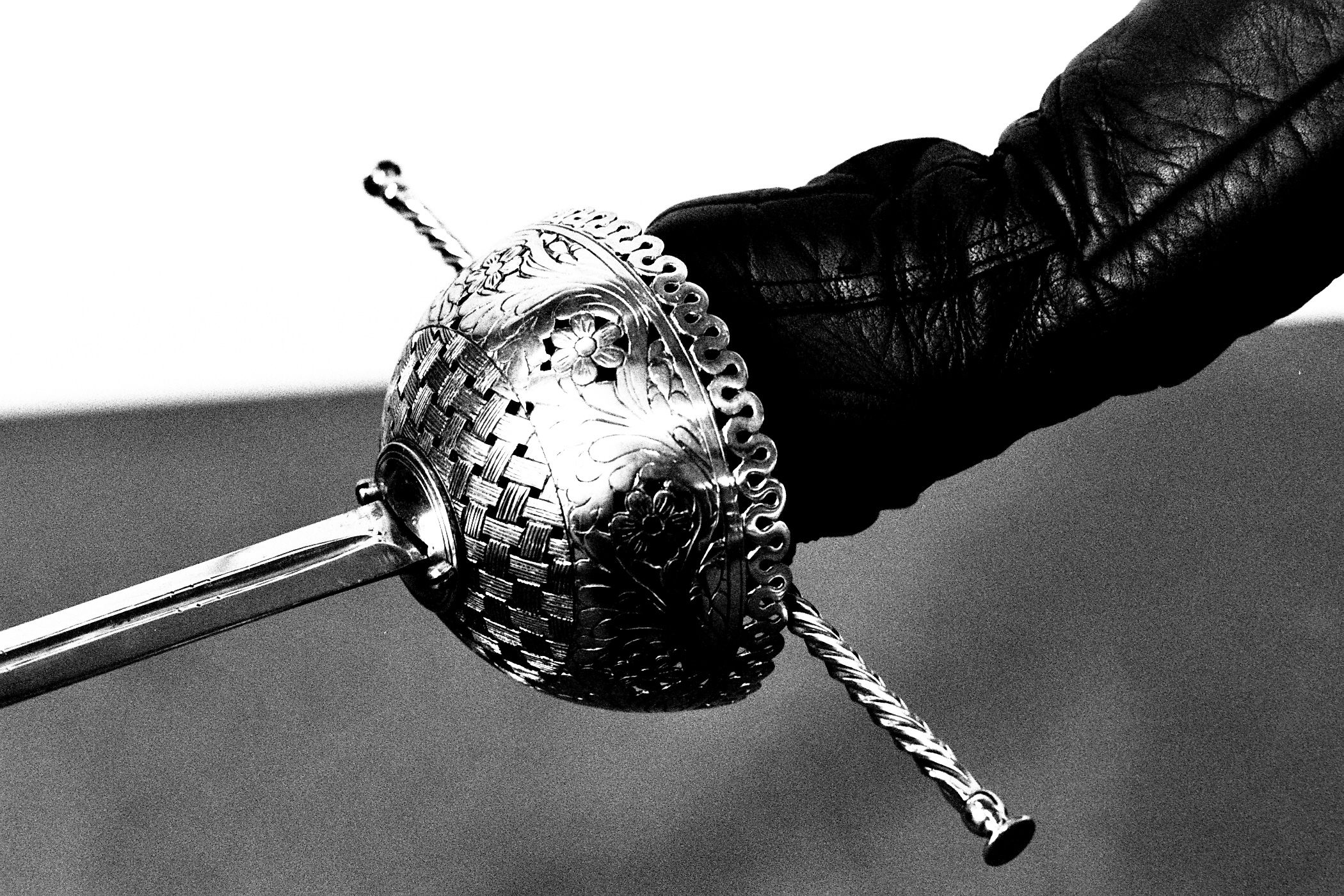
Cup hilt, a later Spanish fashion created in the early 1600s

Allowing for fast reactions, and with a long reach, the rapier was well suited to civilian combat in the 16th and 17th centuries. As military-style cutting and thrusting swords continued to evolve to meet needs on the battlefield, the rapier continued to evolve to meet the needs of civilian combat and decorum, eventually becoming lighter, shorter and less cumbersome to wear. This is when the rapier began to give way to the colichemarde, which was itself later superseded by the small sword which was later superseded by the épée. Noticeably, there were some "war rapiers" that feature a relatively wide blade mounted on a typical rapier hilt during this era. These hybrid swords were used in the military, even on the battlefield. The sword carried by King Gustavus Adolphus in the Thirty Years' War is a typical example of the "war rapier".

By the year 1715, the rapier had been largely replaced by the lighter small sword throughout most of Europe, although the former continued to be used, as evidenced by the treatises of Donald McBane (1728), P. J. F. Girard (1736) and Domenico Angelo (1787). The rapier is still used today by officers of the Swiss Guard of the pope.

== Historical schools of rapier fencing ==
=== Italy ===
- Achille Marozzo, Opera Nova Chiamata Duello, O Vero Fiore dell'Armi de Singulari Abattimenti Offensivi, & Diffensivi – 1536
- Angelo Viggiani dal Montone, Trattato dello Schermo – 1575
- Anonimo Bolognese, L'Arte della Spada (M-345/M-346 Manuscripts) – (early or mid 16th century) date it to "about 1550"
- Antonio Manciolino, Opera Nova per Imparare a Combattere, & Schermire d'ogni sorte Armi – 1531
- Bondi di Mazo, La Spada Maestra – 1696
- Camillo Agrippa, Trattato di Scientia d'Arme con un Dialogo di Filosofia – 1553
- Francesco Alfieri, La Scherma di Francesco Alfieri – 1640
- Francesco Antonio Marcelli, Regole della Scherma – 1686
- Giacomo di Grassi, Ragion di Adoprar Sicuramente l'Arme si da Offesa, come da Difesa – 1570
- Giovanni dall'Agocchie, Dell'Arte di Scrimia – 1572
- Giuseppe Morsicato Pallavicini, La Scherma Illustrata – 1670
- Marco Docciolini, Trattato in Materia di Scherma – 1601
- Nicoletto Giganti, Scola overo Teatro – 1606
- Ridolfo Capo Ferro, Gran Simulacro dell'Arte e dell'Uso della Scherma – 1610
- Salvator Fabris, De lo Schermo ovvero Scienza d'Armi – 1606

=== Spain ===
- Jerónimo Sánchez de Carranza, De la Filosofía de las Armas (1569)
- Luis Pacheco de Narváez, Libro de las Grandezas de la Espada (1599)

=== The Netherlands ===
- Girard Thibault, Academie de l'Espée (1630)

=== France ===
- André Desbordes, Discours de la théorie et de la pratique de l'excellence des armes (1610)
- Charles Besnard, Le maistre d'arme liberal (1653)
- François Dancie, Discours des armes et methode pour bien tirer de l'espée et poignard (c. 1610) and L'Espee de combat (1623)

=== England ===
- Joseph Swetnam, The Schoole of the Noble and Worthy Science of Defence (1617)
- The Pallas Armata (1639)
- Vincentio Saviolo, His Practise 1595

=== Germany ===
- Jakob Sutor, Künstliches Fechtbuch (1612)
- Joachim Meyer, Thorough Descriptions of the free Knightly and Noble Art of Fencing (1570)
- Johannes Georgius Bruchius (1671)
- Paulus Hector Mair, Opus Amplissimum de Arte Athletica (1542)

=== The classical fencing tradition ===
Classical fencing schools claim to have inherited aspects of rapier forms in their systems. In 1885, fencing scholar Egerton Castle wrote "there is little doubt that the French system of fencing can be traced, at its origin, to the ancient Italian swordsmanship; the modern Italian school being of course derived in an uninterrupted manner from the same source." Castle went on to note that "the Italians have preserved the rapier form, with cup, pas d'ane, and quillons, but with a slender quadrangular blade."

== See also ==
- Estoc
- Historical European martial arts
- Oakeshott typology
- Spada da lato
