= Flame-bladed sword =

Sword with an undulating blade

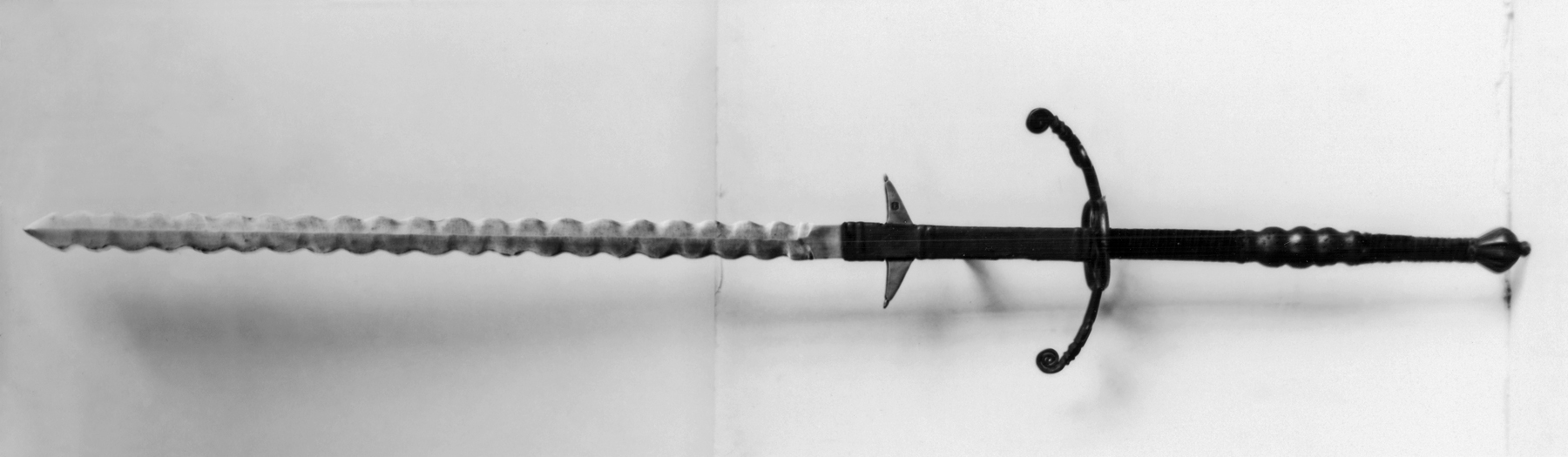
A Flammenschwert

A flame-bladed sword or wave-bladed sword has a characteristically undulating style of blade. The wave in the blade is often considered to contribute a flame-like quality to the appearance of a sword. The dents on the blade can appear parallel or in a zig-zag manner. The two most common flame-bladed swords are rapiers or Zweihänders. A flame-bladed sword was not exclusive to a certain country or region. The style of blade can be found on swords from modern-day Germany, France, Spain, and Switzerland.

== Flambard, Flammard, and Flammenschwert ==
The two-handed flame-bladed sword is referred to by the German Flammenschwert (literally "flame-sword"). These swords are very similar to the two-handed sword or Zweihänder, the only difference being the blade. The design of the blade is decorative along with being functional by causing unpleasant vibrations when parried. Still, the undulating blade is no more effective at cutting than a straight one. An advantage over swords with a straight blade is that a waved blade could better distribute the force of impact and thus was less likely to break. It could also threaten the opponent in a duel and may have discouraged them from grabbing the blade. Like other Zweihänders, they were used during the 16th century by the Landsknechts (well-trained and experienced swordsmen) for single-fights, protecting castle/town walls, or sometimes to protect the banner on the battlefield.

== Flamberge ==
Flamberge ("flaming"), from the French "flamber", is a term with many connotations, including swords without the flamed-blade. The term is a frequent name or alias for swords in medieval chansons de geste and romances, where it often just means a large sword. Egerton Castle used the term to refer to swords that were a transition from the rapier to the smallsword. These swords did not necessarily have an undulated blade. Castle makes note of this being the case of certain Swiss rapiers, but flamberge quickly became a disdainful term in France to refer to flamboyant swords. This comes from the French expression "Mettre flamberge au vent", meaning "To put [the sword] in the wind". Here, it is suggested that the wielder of the sword likened it to the mythical sword Durendal, which alternatively was called flamberge.

== Freemason flame-bladed swords ==
Freemason lodges have used flame-bladed swords in their ceremonies, and some still at least possess one sword. There is one in the museum at the Grand Lodge Freemason's Hall in London. Freemasonry sources suggest a symbolic connection to the ‘flaming sword’ from the Book of Genesis 3:24.

== Gallery ==
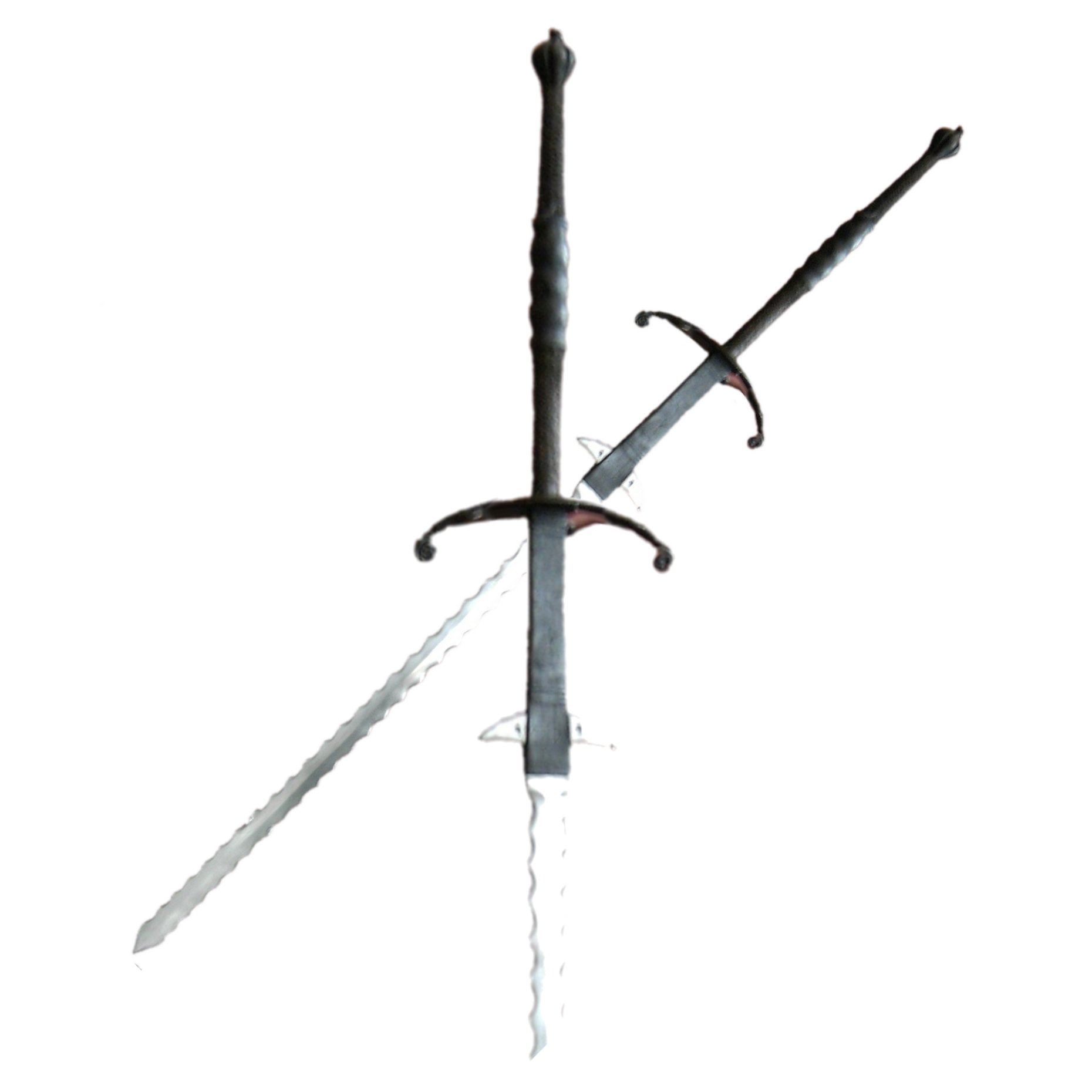
A Flammenschwert. This is a two-handed sword featuring an exceptionally long blade and hilt, a wide crossguard, and a ricasso with a pair of parrying hooks

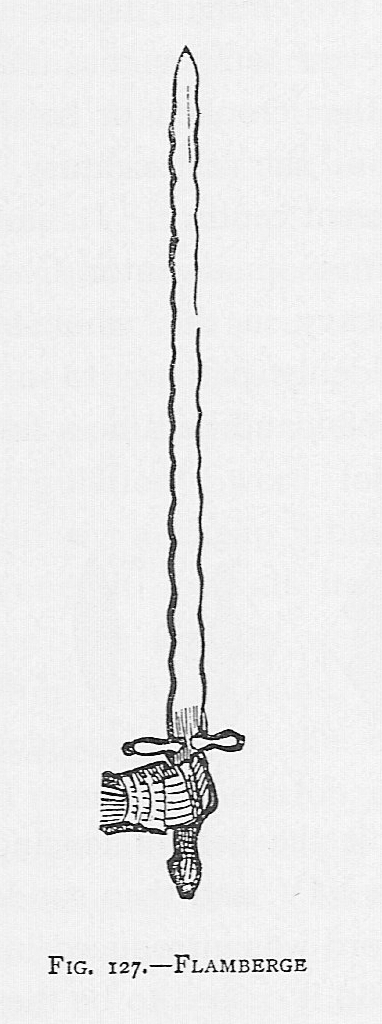
A one-handed sword of the flamberge type

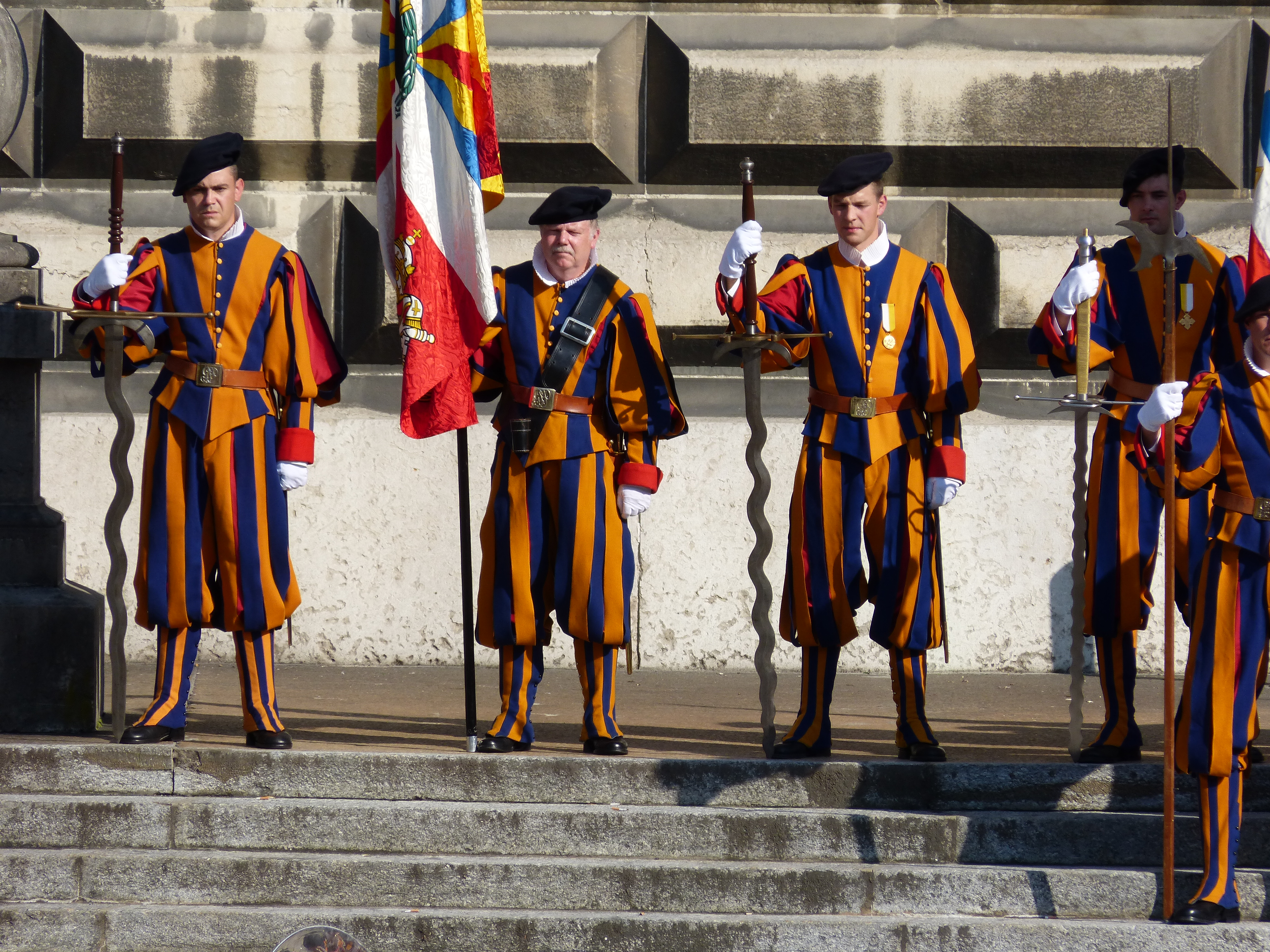
Members of the Pontificial Swiss Guard with Flammenschwerter

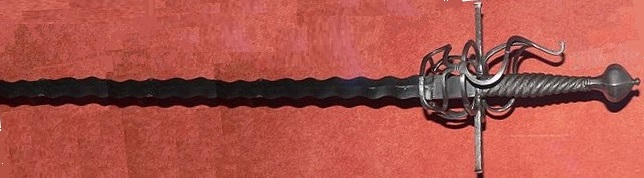
A flame-bladed sword with swept hilt

== See also ==
- Colichemarde blade — a type of robust smallsword blade
- Flaming Sword (supernatural artifact) — flaming swords in ancient narratives
- Kris — a Southeast Asian bladed weapon with a similar flame-shaped blade
