= Small sword =

Light one-handed sword designed for thrusting

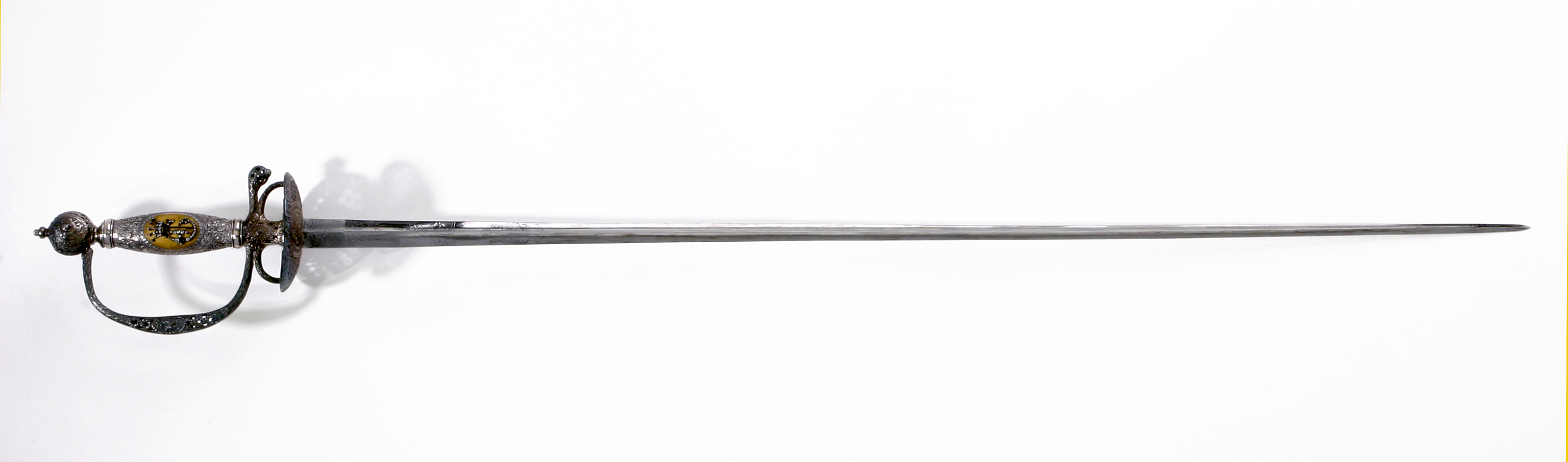
A smallsword of c. 1760, showing the light construction and narrow thrusting blade of this type of sword

The small sword or smallsword (also court sword, Gaelic: claidheamh beag or claybeg, French: épée de cour, lit. “Sword of the court”) is a light one-handed sword designed for thrusting which evolved out of the longer and heavier rapier (espada ropera) of the late Renaissance. The height of the small sword's popularity was during the 18th century, when any civilian or soldier with pretensions to gentlemanly status would have worn a small sword daily.

The blade of a small sword is comparatively short at around 0.6 to 0.85 metres (24 to 33 in), though some reach over 1 metre (39 in). It usually tapers to a sharp point but may lack a cutting edge. It is typically triangular in cross-section, although some of the early examples still have the rhombic and spindle-shaped cross-sections inherited from older weapons, like the rapier. This triangular cross-section may be hollow ground for additional lightness. Many small swords of the period between the 17th and 18th centuries were found with colichemarde blades.

It is thought to have appeared in France and spread quickly across the rest of Europe. The small sword was the immediate predecessor of the French duelling sword (from which the épée developed) and its method of use—as typified in the works of such authors as Sieur de Liancour, Domenico Angelo, Monsieur J. Olivier and Monsieur L'Abbat—developed into the techniques of the French classical school of fencing. The small sword was mainly used as a duelling weapon.

Militarily, small swords continued to be used as a standard sidearm for infantry officers. In some branches with strong traditions, this practice continues to the modern day, albeit for ceremonial and formal dress only. The carrying of swords by officers in battle was rare after the nineteenth century. The 1913 U.S. Army Manual of Bayonet Drill includes instructions for how to defend against an opponent with a smallsword. Bayonets of the period, such as the British Pattern 1907 bayonet, were relatively long with total lengths of 20 in (510 mm) or more not uncommon. While a little larger, a smallsword could be carried in a very similar manner and would not appear out of place.

== Hilt ==
The small sword guard is typically of the "shell" type, sometimes with two lobes that were decorated as clam shells. The shells were often replaced with a simple curved oval disk, which was still referred to as the coquille (shell). In later foils, the lobed type evolved into the lunette or figure-8 guard, and the disk became the modern foil "bell" guard, but the guards were still referred to as coquilles. Small swords with this type of guard normally included other features of the older rapier hilt, including quillons, ricasso, knuckle-bow, and a pas d'âne, although these were often atrophied beyond the point of usefulness, serving mainly as a decorative element. However, they were maintained in a usable state on some weapons, including the Italian foil, into the 20th century.

In the 19th century, simple cross-hilt small swords were also produced, largely as ceremonial weapons that were evocative of more ancient types of weapons. An example is the US model 1840 NCO sword, which is still used on ceremonial occasions. As the wearing of swords fell out of fashion and the small sword evolved into the duelling sword (forerunner of the modern épée), the older hilts gave way to simpler grips such as the French grip and Italian grip.

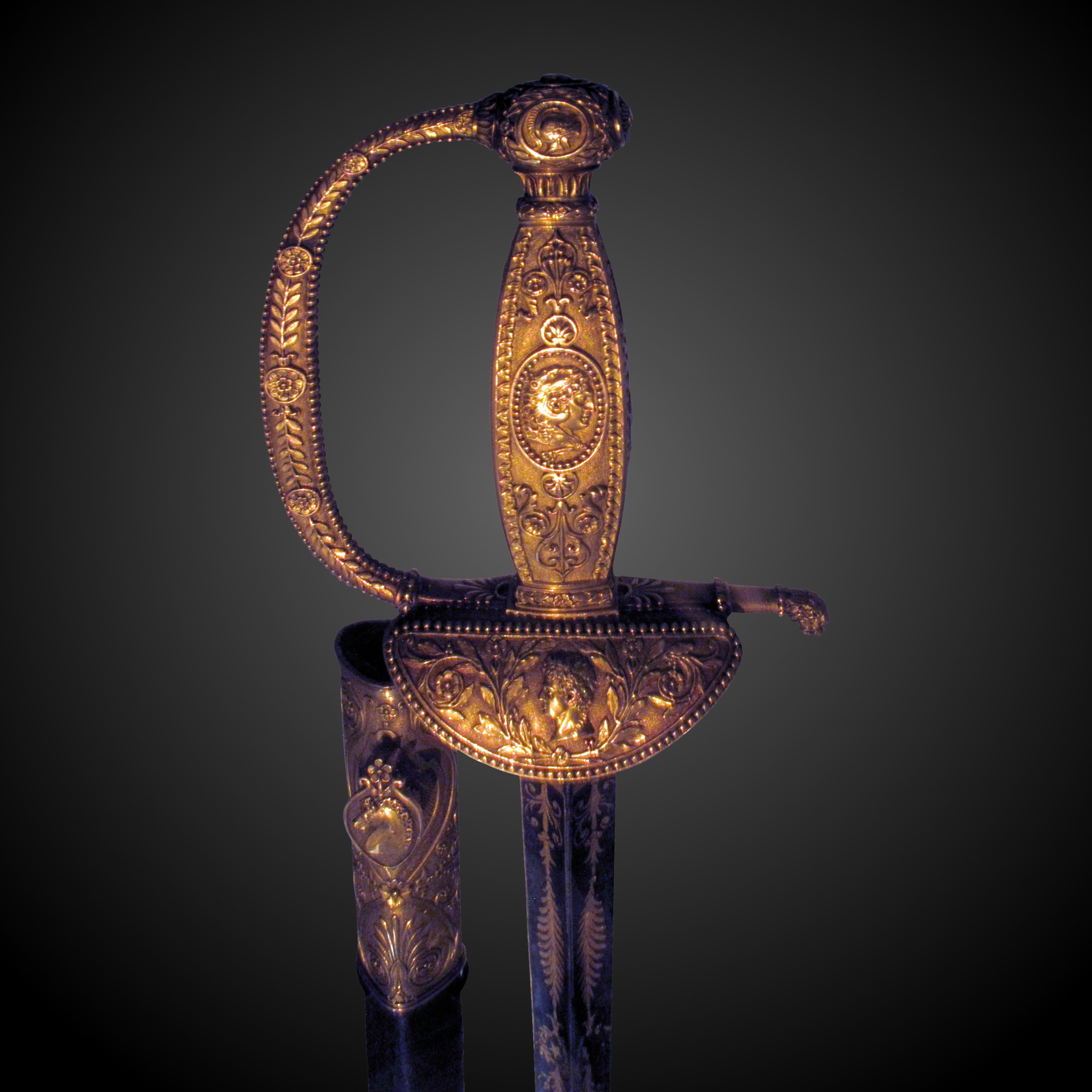
Sword of Napoléon, carried at the Battle of Austerlitz and which he kept all his life.

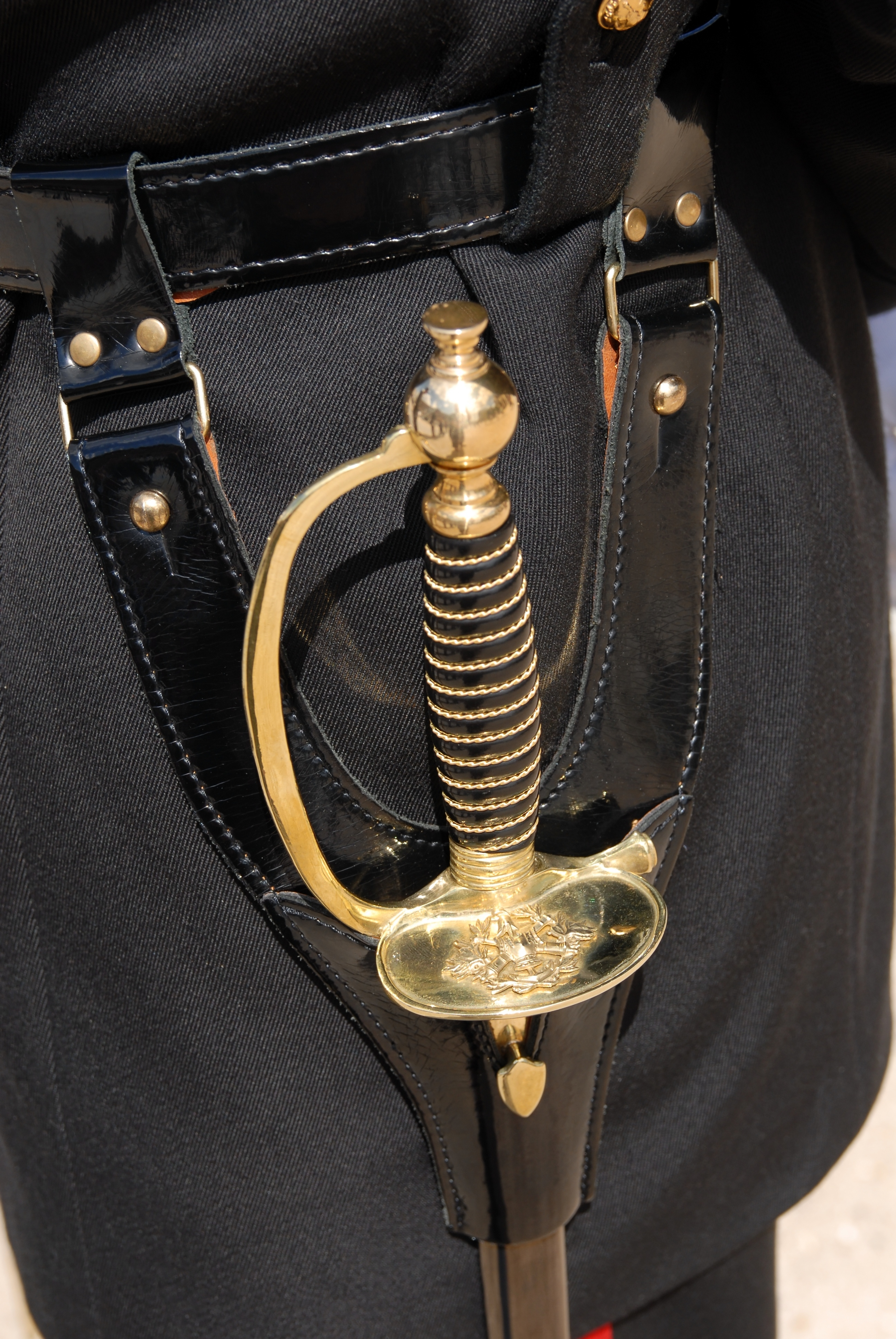
Hilt of the sword worn by students of the École Polytechnique in dress uniform

== Use ==
Small swords were used both by the military and as a dueling weapon. The very height of the small sword's widespread popularity was in the 18th century, when it was considered fashionable by aristocrats ("no gentleman was dressed without his sword" – contemporary idiom of the middle of the 18th century), but it was still used as a duelling weapon until the middle of the 20th century. For instance, Gaston Defferre and René Ribière used larger and heavier versions of the épée, which both had small sword-blades instead of the flexible épée-blades (which have been used in sport fencing through the present day) in their duel on April 21, 1967, in Neuilly, Paris. The use of the small sword for infantry is covered in the US manual of 1861 titled The Militiaman's Manual.

In modern times, the sword is often used as part of court uniform and dress. A German version of the small sword called Trauerdegen ("mourning épée") is still in use by the Reitendiener of the city of Hamburg in Germany.
