= Forte (fencing) =

Part of the blade in fencing

In fencing, forte (from the Romance root meaning "strong") is "the strong part" of the blade—the one-third closest to the hilt. The "strength" refers to the control established over the opponent's weapon upon contact of one's forte with the opponent's foible (a situation of favourable leverage).

Fencer Ridolfo Capo Ferro defined the forte as the blade from the hilt to the middle. From the middle to the top is known as the debole.

== Debole ==
The debole is the part of the sword, especially a rapier, that is used for offensive actions.

Italian fencing master Ridolfo Capo Ferro defined the forte as the blade from the hilt to the middle. From the middle to the top is known as the debole. For the debole only, the edges are labeled true and false, the former being the lower edge when the sword is held horizontally. The flats of the sword are not named.

By contrast, fencing master Salvator Fabris divides the debole into two sections, the third and fourth part (the first and second are divisions of the forte). The third part, midway to three-quarters of the way to the tip, is ineffective but not entirely useless for defense. The fourth part, containing the tip, can only be used for offense. For cuts, Fabris recommends that a portion of both the third and fourth part be used.

== See also ==
- Parry (fencing)
