= Ridolfo Capo Ferro =

Italian fencer

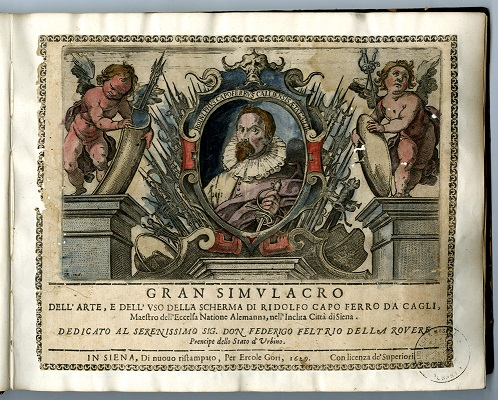
Title page of the 1629 edition, including a portrait of Capo Ferro.

Ridolfo Capo Ferro da Cagli (Ridolfo Capoferro, Rodulphus Capoferrus) was an Italian fencing master in the city of Siena, best known for his rapier fencing treatise published in 1610.

He seems to have been born in the town of Cagli in the Duchy of Urbino (nowadays Province of Pesaro e Urbino), but was active as a fencing master in Siena, Tuscany. Little else is known about his life, though the dedication to Federico Ubaldo della Rovere, the young son of Duke Francesco Maria II della Rovere, may indicate that he was associated with the court at Urbino in some capacity. The statement at the beginning of Capo Ferro's treatise describing him as a "master of the great German nation" likely signifies that he was faculty at the University of Siena, either holding a position analogous to dean of all German students, or perhaps merely the fencing master who taught the German students.

== Art and Use of Fencing ==
Capo Ferro's treatise Gran Simulacro dell'Arte e dell'Uso della Scherma ("Great Representation of the Art and Use of Fencing") was printed by Salvestro Marchetti and Camillo Turi in Siena, with illustrations by Rafael Schiamirossi, and is divided into two parts: Art and Practice.

In the first part, he gives the general principles of swordsmanship and fencing, with the second part of his book covering actual techniques, described in text with accompanying illustrations. His work is interesting in that some methods that he denigrates in his theory he uses in his actions; most notably, he dismisses feints as dangerous or useless (depending upon the situation) and then uses them liberally in various actions in the second part of his book.

The sword that Capo Ferro recommends should be "twice as long as the arm, and as much as my extraordinary pace (i.e., the lunge), which length corresponds equally to that which is from my armpit down to the sole of my foot." For a 6' tall man, this would equate to a 4 1/2' long sword.

The book covers the use of the single rapier, including basic sword grappling, as well as rapier and dagger, rapier and cloak, and rapier and rotella, a most unusual combination for the period, though far more common in the tradition of swordsmanship of the 16th century, which preceded it. The rotella is a medium-sized concave round shield of approximately 60 cm in diameter with two straps to hold it. Similar metal shields survive, particularly from Spain in this period, though very few from Italy, implying that these shields were made of a perishable material such as wood or leather or a composite of such materials. The manual also includes techniques for fighting against a left-handed opponent.

While many modern reference books state that rapiers were either blunt on their edges or only had sharp edges in order to discourage blade grabs because they were not suitable for the cut, nearly 30% of the techniques included in Capoferro's treatise use the cut as a primary or secondary option.

Capoferro's book was reprinted in Siena in 1629 by Ercole Gori, who had the plain backgrounds in twenty-seven of Schiamirossi's original illustrations replaced with intricate depictions of scenes from the Bible and Greek mythology; this version was reprinted in Bologna in 1652 by G. Longo. A third Siena printing was made in 1632 by Bernardino Capitelli, who omitted all of the introductory material and truncated the descriptions of the plays; he also commissioned new illustrations based on those of the first edition but scaled down to half size.

== Spelling of name ==
The title page of Capoferro's book spells his surname as two words in Italian, Capo Ferro, and one word in Latin, Capoferrus. However, the spellings of such things were not standardized in this time, and various spellings can be seen in other sources. "Prima [e secundi] parte dell'Historia siciliana (1606)" clearly shows the name spelt as two words, whereas Giuseppe Morsicato-Pallavicini's 1670 fencing treatise offers it as Capoferro; some works, such as "Bibliotheca Stoschiana sive Catalogus selectissimorum librorum quos Collegerat Philippvs Liber Baro De Stosch" (1759), even have the name hyphenated (Capo-Ferro).

More recent writers, such as Jacopo Gelli's fencing bibliography, Sydney Anglo's book The Martial Arts of Renaissance Europe, and the listing of his books in many library catalogues, use the modern Italian spelling of the name, Capoferro.

== Influence ==
Capoferro's book must have been reasonably popular, as it was reprinted several times, but not many of the fencing treatises written in the next generation mention him and those that do are not necessarily complimentary. However, an extensive German rapier manual published in 1615 by Sebastian Heussler clearly draws many concepts from Capoferro and Salvator Fabris, combining their teachings into one system. Heussler even uses one of Capoferro's illustrations (figure 9) unmodified.

Though not very influential in his own time, Capo Ferro was strongly praised by more recent authors such as Egerton Castle, who says in his 'Schools and Masters of Fence (1893)', "[...] but of all the Italian works on fencing none ever had such a share in fixing the principals of the science as 'Great Simulacrum of the Use of the Sword', by Ridolfo Capoferro", later adding "for once the title of the book fully represented its contents."

== In popular culture ==
In the fictional work The Princess Bride by William Goldman, Inigo Montoya and The Man in Black duel atop the Cliffs of Insanity, where they mention various fencing techniques they have studied, including those of Capo Ferro.

In Episode 3 of My Lady Jane, Lady Jane Grey tells Lord Guildford Dudley that she mastered Capo Ferro by the age of 8.

== See also ==
- Salvator Fabris
- Francesco Alfieri

== Literature ==
- Jared Kirby (ed.), Italian Rapier Combat - Ridolfo Capo Ferro, Greenhill Books, London (2004).
- Nick Thomas, "Rapier The Art and Use of Fencing by Ridolfo Capo Ferro", Swordworks, UK (2007)
- Tom Leoni, "Ridolfo Capoferro's The Art and Practice of Fencing", Freelance Academy Press, Inc, USA (2011)
