= François Dancie =

French fencing instructor

François Dancie was a French fencing instructor who wrote two treatises in the seventeenth century. He was a gentleman of Limousin in central France. He may be the same as the François Dancie of Nonards, who was recorded as marrying Jeanne de Linnars, daughter of Jacques de Linnars, Judge of Bretenaux. Jeanne's brother Jean was married to Marie de Maynard, daughter of Géraud de Maynard, counsellor to the Parlement of Toulouse, and also sister to the poet François de Maynard, who wrote a poem for Dancie's 1623 publication.

Dancie's first work, Discours des armes et methode pour bien tirer de l'espée et poignard (Discourse Of Arms And Method To Properly Fence With The Sword And Dagger) is a manuscript of two parts, written some time before 1617. The first part concentrates on the sword and dagger, the second on the single sword. Dancie is brief in his description of posture and guard, concentrating mainly on drawing the opponent into an attack as well as how to deal with overly aggressive opponents.

The second, L'Espee de combat is a fuller development of Dancie's system published in 1623. In this work, he pours criticism on those who follow the "classic" method of fencing, such as Agrippa, yet praises teachers such as the Calvacabos of Bologna, who taught at the French court at the time. Dancie's methodology is predominantly concerned with drawing out and countering an attack from the opponent as well as how to face down an enraged and reckless enemy.

Dancie's work does not appear to have been reprinted after 1623, nor does he appear to have been referenced in any further texts.
