= Ricasso =

Unsharpened length of blade between the guard or handle on a knife

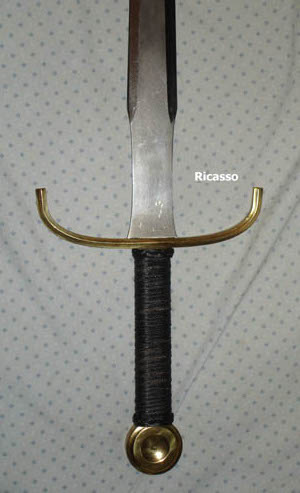
A modern hand-and-a-half sword with a short ricasso

A ricasso is an unsharpened length of blade just above the guard or handle on a knife, dagger, sword, or bayonet. Blades designed this way appear at many periods in history in many parts of the world and date back to at least the Bronze Age—essentially, as long as humans have shaped cutting tools from metals.

There were many reasons to make a blade with a ricasso, and in Europe, later longswords, claymores, rapiers, and other lengthy swords often had this feature. One very simple influence presently and historically is fashion, which may answer this question for blades whose presence or absence of a ricasso has no effect on how it is used. Leaving a ricasso can also save the blade maker's time—a section of blade that would not be used given the purpose of the piece does not have to be shaped and sharpened. In many cases, however, they are quite functional.

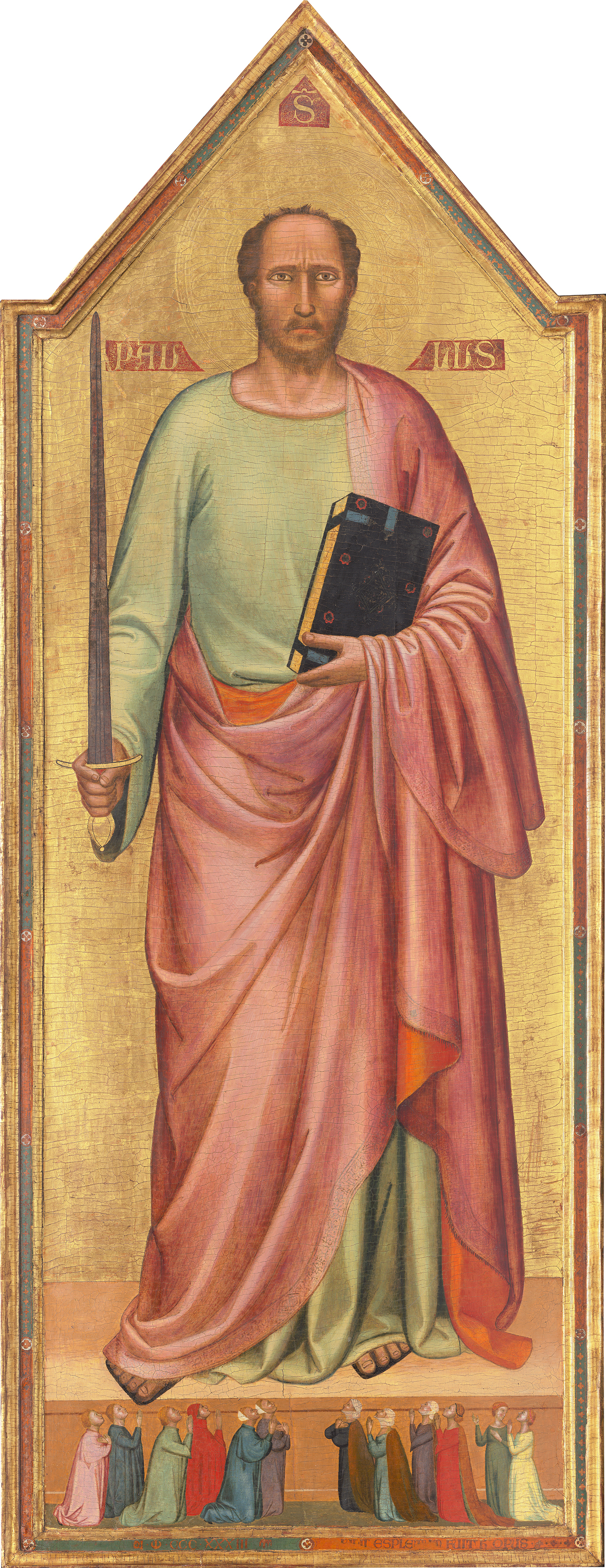
A painting of Saint Paul by Bernardo Daddi, 1333. Paul is depicted with his index finger placed above the crossguard

Historically, ricassos were commonly present on medieval and early Renaissance swords. The basic function was to allow the wielder to place their index finger above the crossguard, which potentially allowed for greater grip strength and torque. This technique was a factor in the evolution of compound hilts, which are iconic of rapiers and other Renaissance swords, as the compound hilt allows a ricasso grip while still protecting the hand.

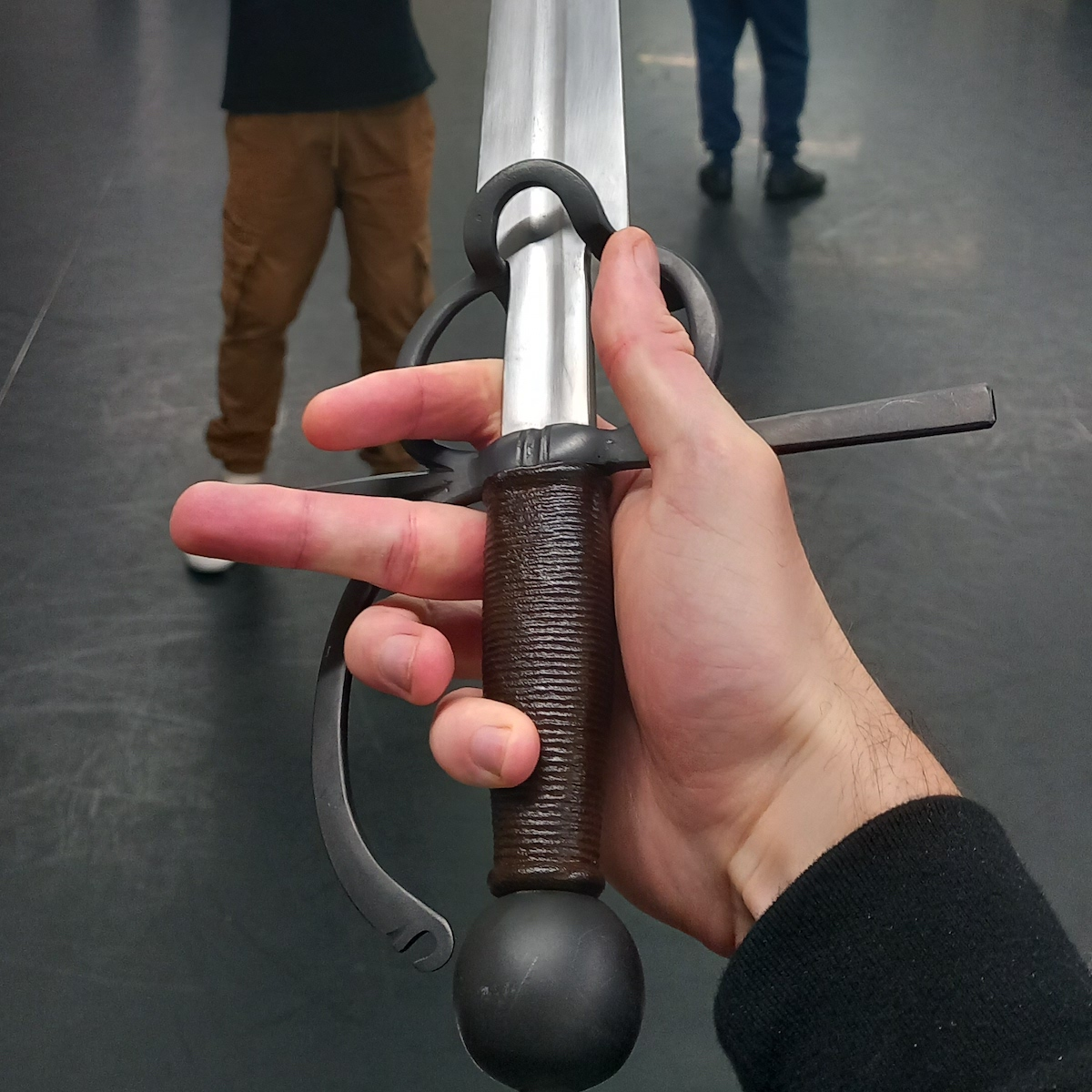
An enclosed ricasso protected by an extended guard is demonstrated on a modern side-sword, providing cover for the index finger

Some of the best-known historic examples of ricassos are on large European swords used with two hands. When used aggressively with adequate space to build up swinging momentum, the weapon would be held at the end of the grip for the best reach and power. Some experts on historical combat believe that this technique of sustained blade swinging was used as a tactic for swordsmen to penetrate pike formations. However, once the pike line was broken, the swordsman then used the ricasso on his sword to shorten his grip, allowing the sword to be more effectively manoeuvred in the tight press within the enemy ranks as well as offering more leverage and ability to thrust. The ricassos of two-handed swords often have a second, smaller set of quillons past the ricasso, effectively creating a secondary grip. This technique is very similar to the half-sword technique, which involves gripping the sharpened midsection of the blade to turn the blade into a sort of lever weapon. It is possible even without gauntlets to hold a sharpened blade relatively safely, with proper technique.

Today, many knives seen outside of the kitchen include a bevel section, though the term is seldom used. These ricassos may serve purely decorative purposes; may offer greater blade strength at a high-stress point, or may be intended to be gripped to provide greater control when performing precise cutting.

A sub-hilt (an additional section of guard located along the length of the grip of a blade, rather than up the blade as with a fluke), is a related feature sometimes found on knives instead of a ricasso. Depending on design, it can offer many of the same advantages in versatility but makes the choked up grip more comfortable. Some blades may have both a sub-hilt and a ricasso, thus offering two possible forward grip positions.

== See also ==
- Half-sword
- Side-sword
- Rapier
