= Johannes Georgius Bruchius =

17th century German and Dutch fencer

Johannes Georgius Bruchius was a fencing master in the 17th century, who was originally from Germany, but lived and worked in the Netherlands. His book, Thorough description Of the Noble and Knightly Fencing or Weapon-Art, was published in Leiden in 1671, and later re-published in Amsterdam in 1676. An English translation of this work, along with a biographical investigation into Johannes Georgius Bruchius was published by Reinier van Noort in 2015.
