= Spada da lato =

Renaissance-era sword type

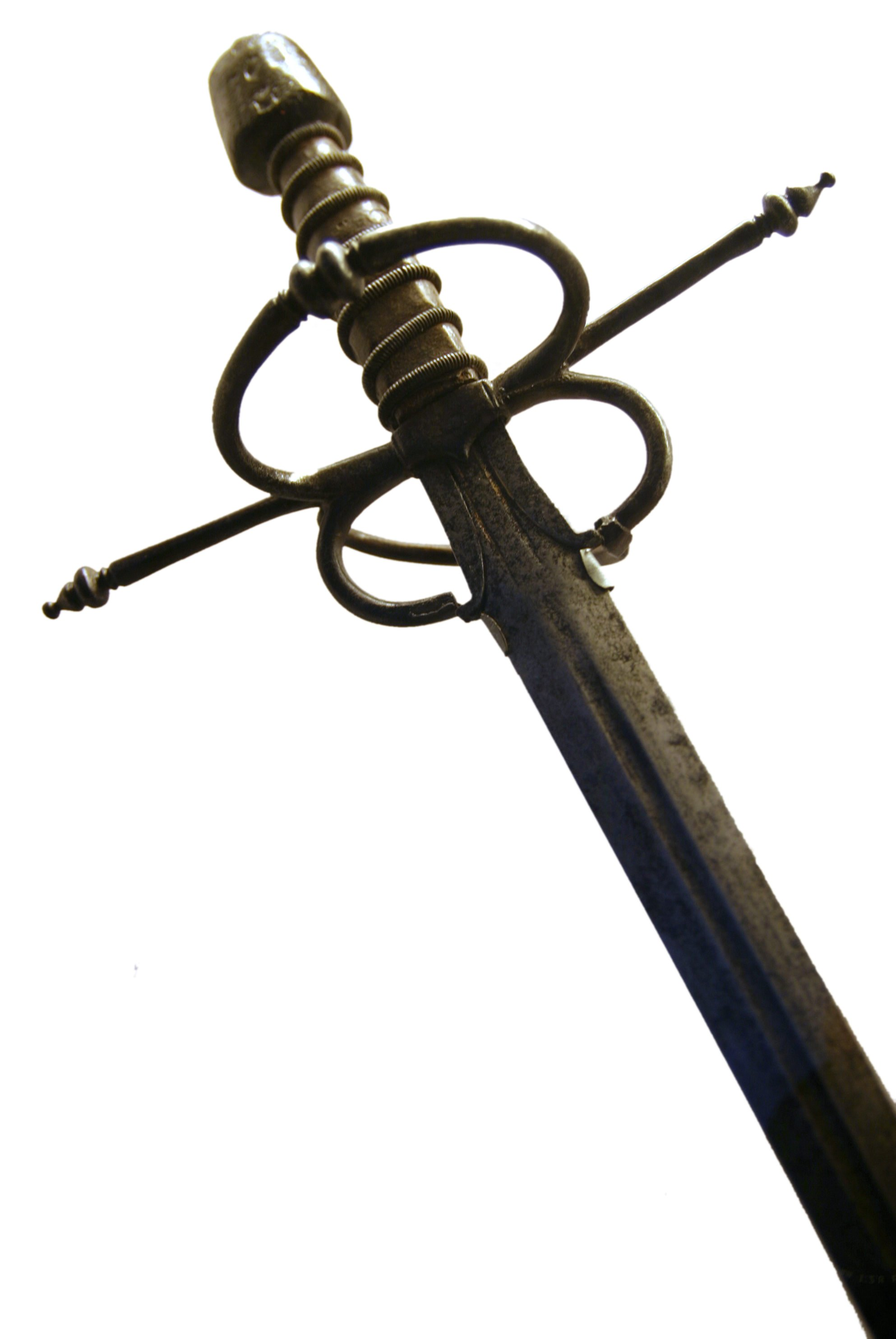
An early rapier or "side-sword" on exhibit in the Castle of Chillon.

The spada da lato (Italian) or side-sword is a type of sword popular in Italy during the Renaissance. It is a continuation of the medieval knightly sword, and the immediate predecessor, or early form, of the rapier of the early modern period. Side-swords were used concurrently with rapiers as well, particularly for military applications, although differentiating swords between civilian and military use was not something that was done in the period when a soldier had to arm himself. Its use was taught in the Dardi school of Italian fencing and others, and was influential on the classical rapier fencing of the 17th century. The equivalent Spanish term, espada ropera ("dress sword") is seen as the origin of the term rapier, although this is disputed. Italian antiquarians use the term spada da lato for rapiers typical of the period of c. 1560–1630. The Italian term for the fully developed rapier of the later 17th century is spada da lato striscia, or just spada striscia ("strip-sword"), but the term rapier or rapiera is also used in modern Italian.
