= Codex Wallerstein =

Literary work

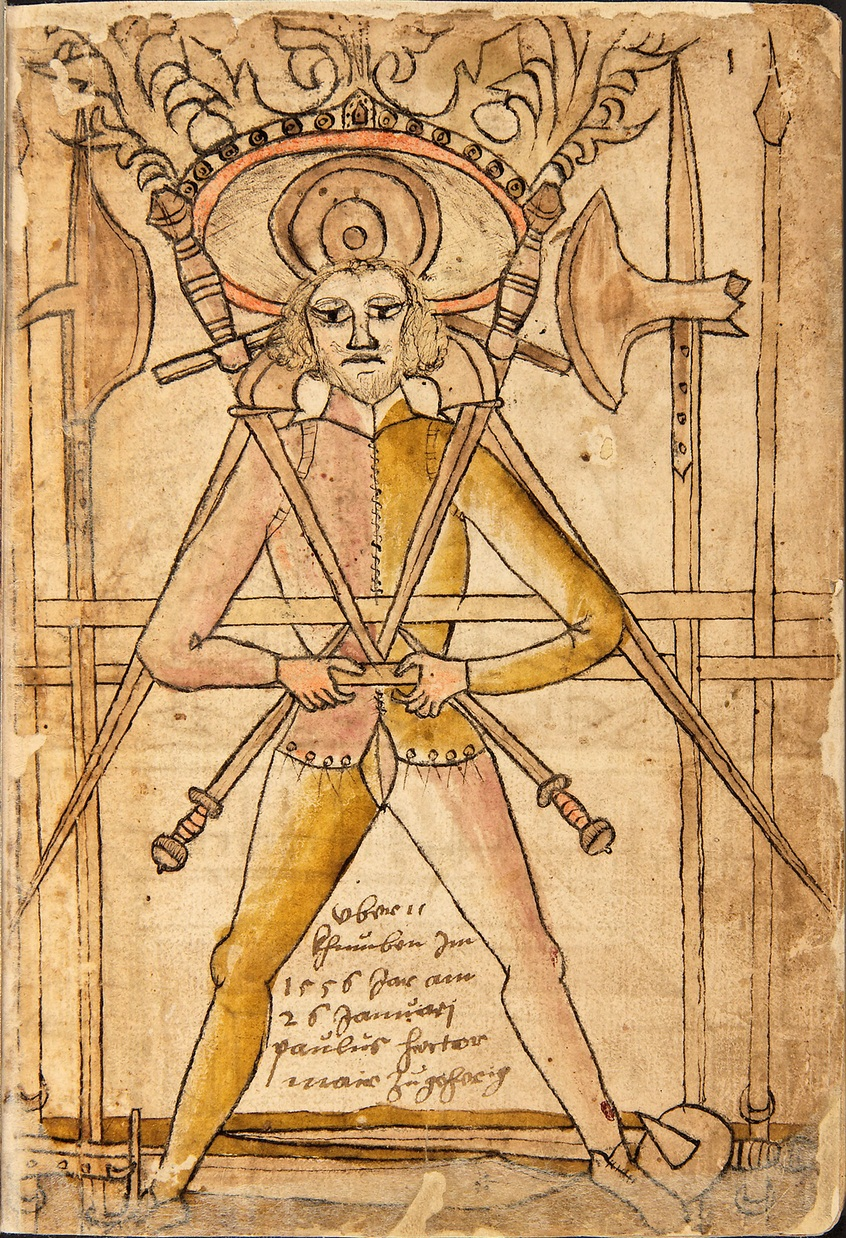
The first page shows a fencer with various arms.

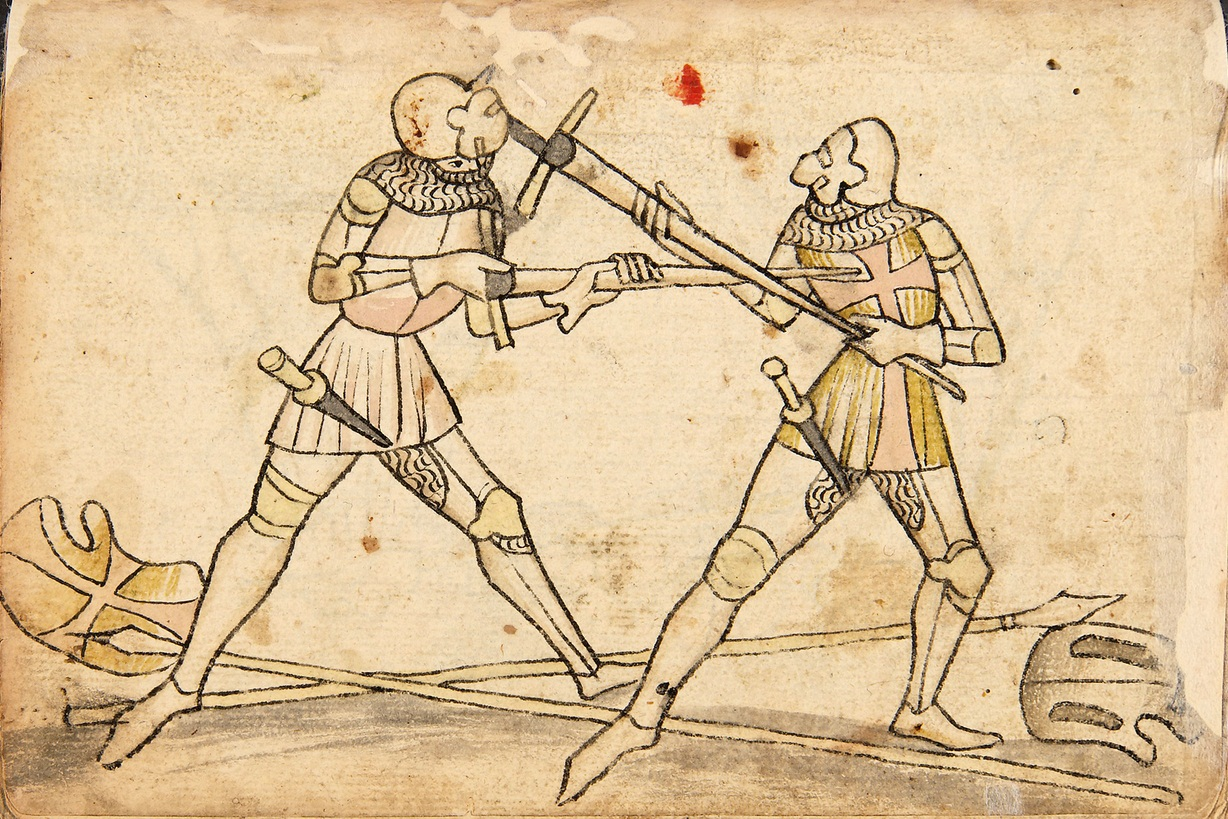
Illustration of a half-sword thrust against a mordhau in armoured longsword combat. (Plate 214)

The so-called Codex Wallerstein or Vonn Baumanns Fechtbuch (Oettingen-Wallerstein Cod. I.6.4^{o}.2, Augsburg University library) is a 16th-century convolution of three 15th-century fechtbuch manuscripts, with a total of 221 pages.

The inside of the cover is inscribed 1549. Vom baumanns 108, suggesting that the manuscript belonged to one Michael Baumann, listed as a mercenary by profession in the tax registers of Augsburg between 1471 and 1495. The manuscript came in the possession of Paulus Hector Mair in 1556. After Mair's execution in 1579, the manuscript may have passed to the library of Marcus Fugger, whose library was sold by his grandson in 1653, passing into the Oettingen-Wallerstein library.

== Contents ==
Part A treats fighting with the longsword, dagger and messer. Part B is inserted in two parts, interrupting the first part, treating grappling. Parts A and B were made in c. 1470; the paper is dated to 1464/5 based on its watermark. Part A is considered a source for the fechtbuch of Albrecht Dürer of 1512.

Part C is somewhat older, made in the first half of the 15th century. The paper is dated to 1420 based on its watermark. It treats longsword, armored combat, duelling shield (stechschild), and grappling.

The final page, fol. 109r, has a register, written in the hand of Paulus Hector Mair (foll. 109v and 110 are empty).

=== Part A ===
- 3r-14v, 21r, 21v longsword techniques
- 22r-28v dagger
- 29r-32v messer

=== Part B ===
- 15r-20v, 33r-74r grappling
- 74v drawing of an armed robbery (with instructions for the robber to draw blood from the victim's neck for intimidation)

[fol. 75 empty]

=== Part C ===
- 1r, a drawing of a fencer with various arms, still used as a title page in the convoluted ms. and inscribed with Paulus Hector's name.
- 1v-2r, a double page illustration showing a fighting arena with spectators
- 76r-80v, 101r-102v longsword
- 81r-91v, [fol. 92 empty] 93r-95v, 103r-108r armoured combat
- 96r-96v, 98v judicial combat, Swabian law (with swords)
- 97r-98r judicial combat, Franconian law (with clubs)
- 98v-100v grappling (fol. 98v combines a grappling image with a judicial combat one)
- 108v, image of a wedding ceremony.

== See also ==
- Fechtbuch
- Historical European martial arts
