= English longsword school =

While the majority of surviving sources concerning the use of the two-handed longsword detail the German school of swordsmanship and the Italian school of swordsmanship, there was also a smaller English school with its own techniques (for an example: Half-sword). The body of techniques used in English Longsword use has survived to the modern day in three manuscripts: The Ledall Roll (British Library Add MS 39564); Man yt Wol ("The Man that Will") (British Library Harley MS 3542) and the British Library Cotton Titus Manuscript

== Sources ==
The three main sources can be accessed by a research visit to the British Library in London, where all three reside. None of the originals has yet been scanned or made available online, but there are full descriptions in the catalogue. The sources range in time from the Harleian manuscript (1450) to the Ledall Roll (first half 1600s)

== Comparison to German and Italian School ==
The most obvious comparison is the scarce extent of surviving manuscripts. While there are many Italian and comparatively numerous German manuscripts, there are only three English Longsword treatises. Additionally, the English sources are without illustration, so they are text only. This makes them more difficult to interpret. The last challenging factor is that they have largely not been scanned. Despite this, there are some dedicated HEMA Historical European Martial Arts practitioners, in the United Kingdom, and in Australia (largely associated with the Stoccata School of defence) dedicated to the study of the English longsword form.
