= Longsword =

Two-handed, double-edged sword

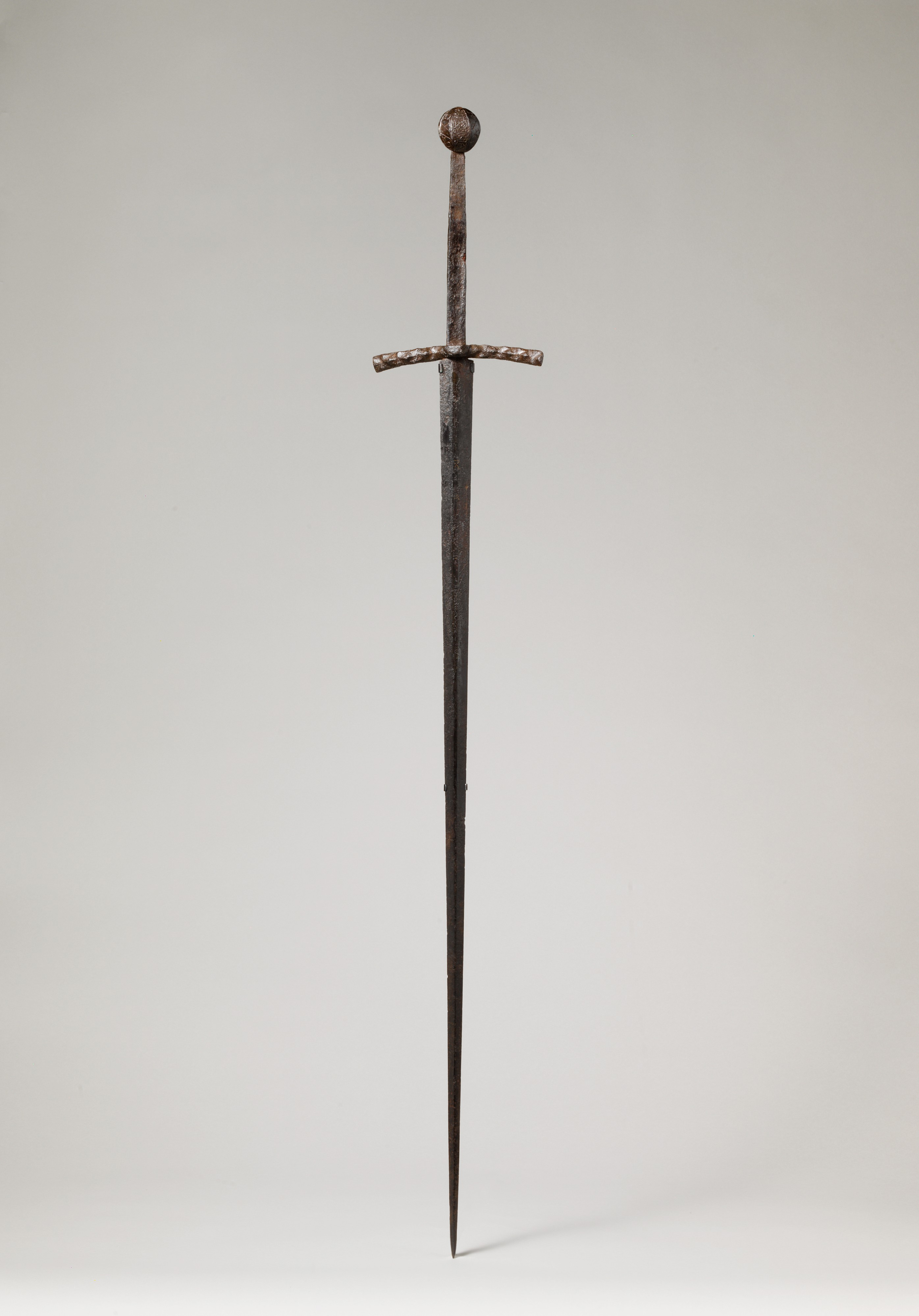
- Hand-and-a-half sword, probably German, c. 1400–1430
- Type: Sword (two-handed, double-edged)
- Place of origin: Europe

Service history
- In service: High Middle Ages, Late Middle Ages, Renaissance, c. 1050–1700

Production history
- Produced: ~1050–1500

Specifications
- Mass: avg. 1.8–3 kg (4.0–6.6 lb)
- Length: total: avg. 100–140 cm (39–55 in) blade: avg. 80–110 cm (31–43 in) grip: avg. 20–30 cm (7.9–11.8 in)

A longsword (also spelled as long sword or long-sword) is a type of European sword characterized as having a cruciform hilt with a grip for primarily two-handed use (around 15 to 30 cm or 6 to 12 in), a straight double-edged blade of around 80 to 110 cm (31 to 43 in), and weighing approximately 2 to 3 kg (4 lb 7 oz to 6 lb 10 oz).

The "longsword" type exists in a morphological continuum with the medieval knightly sword and the Renaissance-era Zweihänder. It was prevalent during the late medieval and Renaissance periods (approximately 1350 to 1550).

== Names ==
=== English ===
The longsword has many names in the English language, which, aside from variant spellings, include terms such as "bastard sword" and "hand-and-a-half sword." Of these, "bastard sword" is the oldest, its use being contemporaneous with the weapon's heyday.

The French épée bâtarde and the English "bastard sword" originate in the 15th or 16th century, originally in the general sense of "irregular sword, sword of uncertain origin", but by the mid-16th century could refer to exceptionally large swords. The "Masters of Defense" competition organised by Henry VIII in July 1540 listed two handed sword and bastard sword as two separate items. It is uncertain whether the same term could still be used to other types of smaller swords, but antiquarian usage in the 19th century established the use of "bastard sword" as referring unambiguously to these large swords.

The term "hand-and-a-half sword" is relatively modern (from the late 19th century); this name was given because the balance of the sword made it usable in one hand, as well as two. During the first half of the 20th century, the term "bastard sword" was also used regularly to refer to this type of sword, while "long sword" (or "long-sword"), if used at all, referred to the rapier (in the context of Renaissance or Early Modern fencing).

Another name originating from the 19th century is "broadsword," which grew out of comparisons of the blade to more slender swords. This name is common in non-expert literature, where it often refers generically to any medieval sword. However, it more properly—and historically—refers to the basket-hilted swords of the 18th century.

Contemporary use of "long-sword" or "longsword" only resurfaced in the 2000s in the context of reconstruction of the German school of fencing, translating the German langes schwert. Prior to this the term "long sword" merely referred to any sword with a long blade; 'long' being simply an adjective rather than a classification.

=== Other languages ===
Historical (15th to 16th century) terms for this type of sword included Portuguese espada-de-armas, estoque or espada de duas mãos for the version with longer handle used exclusively with both hands; Spanish espadón, montante, or mandoble, Italian spada longa (lunga) or spada due mani (Bolognese), and Middle French passot. The Scottish Gaelic claidheamh mòr means "great sword"; Anglicism as claymore, it came to refer to a large Scottish type of longsword with a V–shaped crossguard. Historical terminology overlaps with that applied to the Zweihänder sword in the 16th century: French espadon, Spanish espadón, or Portuguese montante may also be used more narrowly to refer to these large swords. The French épée de passot may also refer to a medieval single-handed sword optimized for thrusting.

The German langes schwert ("long sword") in 15th and 16th-century manuals does not denote a type of weapon, but the technique of fencing with both hands at the hilt, contrasting with kurzes schwert ("short sword") used of fencing with the same weapon, but with one hand gripping the blade (also known as a half-sword).

== Evolution ==
The longsword is characterized not so much by a longer blade, but by a longer grip, which indicates a weapon designed for two-handed use. Swords with exceptionally long hilts are found throughout the High Middle Ages. For example, there is a longsword in The Glasgow Art and History Museum, Labelled XIIIa. 5, which scholars have dated back to between 1100 and 1200 due to the hilt style and specific taper, but swords like this remain incredibly rare, and are not representative of an identifiable trend before the late 13th or early 14th century.

The longsword as a late medieval type of sword emerges in the 14th century, as a military steel weapon of the earlier phase of the Hundred Years' War. It remains identifiable as a type during the period of about 1350 to 1550. It remained in use as a weapon of war intended for wielders wearing full plate armour either on foot or on horseback, throughout the late medieval period. From the late 15th century, however, it is also attested as being worn and used by unarmoured soldiers or mercenaries.

Use of the two-handed Great Sword or Schlachtschwert by infantry (as opposed to their use as a weapon of mounted and fully armoured knights) seems to have originated with the Swiss in the 14th century. By the 16th century, its military use was mostly obsolete, culminating in the brief period where the oversized Zweihänder were wielded by the German Landsknechte during the early to mid 16th century. By the second half of the 16th century, it persisted mostly as a weapon for sportive competition (Schulfechten), and possibly in knightly duels.

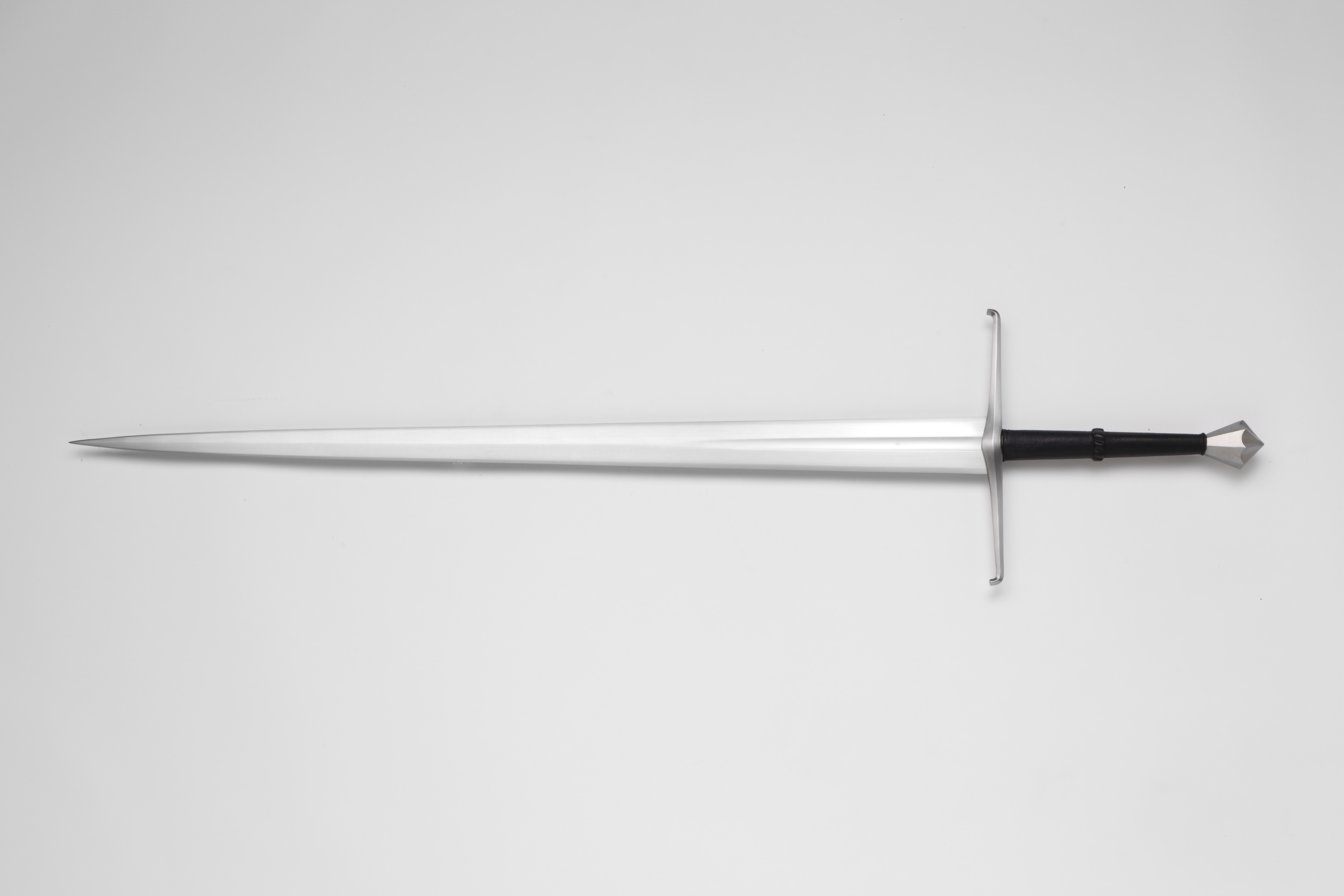
Replica of the Brescia Spadona, a 15th-century "hand and a half" longsword named after the city where it now resides, in the Museo Civico L. Mazzoli in Brescia, Italy. It has a tapered type XVIIIa or type XVIa blade and an octagonal pommel.

Distinct "bastard sword" hilt types developed during the first half of the 16th century. Ewart Oakeshott distinguishes twelve different types. These all seem to have originated in Bavaria and in Switzerland. By the late 16th century, early forms of the developed-hilt appear on this type of sword. Beginning about 1520, the Swiss sabre (schnepf) in Switzerland began to replace the straight longsword, inheriting its hilt types, and the longsword had fallen out of use in Switzerland by 1550. In southern Germany, it persisted into the 1560s, but its use also declined during the second half of the 16th century.

There are two late examples of longswords kept in the Swiss National Museum, both with vertically grooved pommels and elaborately decorated with silver inlay, and both belonging to Swiss noblemen in French service during the late 16th and early 17th century, Gugelberg von Moos and Rudolf von Schauenstein. The longsword, greatsword and bastard-sword were also made in Spain, appearing relatively late, known as the espadon, the montante and bastarda or espada de mano y media respectively.

== Morphology ==
Different blade cross-sections. At the top, variants of the diamond shape. At the bottom, variants of the lenticular shape.

The swords grouped as "longswords" for the purposes of this article are united by their being intended for two-handed use. In terms of blade typology, they do not form a single category. In the Oakeshott typology of blade morphology, "longswords" figure as a range of sub-types of the corresponding single-handed sword types.

- Types XIIa and XIIIa represent the Great Sword or War Sword type used in the 11th and in the 14th century. They represent larger versions of type XII and type XIII swords which were the standard knightly swords during the Crusades. They are primarily intended for cutting, with grips for either "hand-and-half" or two-handed use. Type XIIa blades are broad, flat and evenly tapering, with a lenticular cross-section and a fuller running along about two thirds of the blade's length. Type XIIIa blades are broad, with a flat lenticular cross-section, parallel edges and a fuller running along half the blade's length.
- Type XVa is the classical two-handed sword of the 14th and 15th centuries (with early examples appearing from the later 13th century). These blades are strongly tapered, more narrow and slender even than the single-handed type XV variant, with a flattened diamond cross-section.
- Type XVIa is the classical "longsword" of the 14th and 15th centuries. These blades are long and slowly tapering, with a flat hexagonal blade cross-section and a fuller running along one third of the blade. They represent an optimised compromise between thrusting capability and retaining good cutting characteristics.
- Type XVII is a shorter-lived type, popular during the mid-14th to early 15th century. These blades are long, slender and acutely tapering, approaching the outline of type XVa, while still retaining a narrow hexagonal cross-section and a shallow fuller running along about one quarter of the blade.
- Types XVIIIb and XVIIIc represent the later longswords of the mid-15th to early 16th centuries. They have a flattened diamond cross-section, often with pronounced mid-rib, some being hollow-ground. Type XVIIIb blades are slender, comparable to XVa blades but longer, measuring between 90 and 107 cm, with a correspondingly longer grip, often waisted for comfortable two-handed use. Type XVIIIc blades are somewhat broader and shorter (about 85 cm), and sometimes have a short and narrow fuller.
- Type XX blades are broad, with lenticular or octagonal cross-sections. Their defining characteristics is that they have three fullers, a shallow central fuller running along half the blade's length, with two shallow parallel fullers along the first quarter. They were in use during the 14th and 15th centuries. Sub-type XXa has a more acutely tapering blade and a more acute point.

== Fighting with the longsword ==
The expression fechten mit dem langen schwert ("fencing with the long sword") in the German school of fencing denotes the style of fencing which uses both hands at the hilt; fechten mit dem kurzen schwert ("fencing with the short sword") is used in half-sword fighting, with one hand gripping the blade. The two terms are largely equivalent to "unarmoured fighting" (blossfechten) and "armoured fencing" (fechten im harnisch).

=== History ===
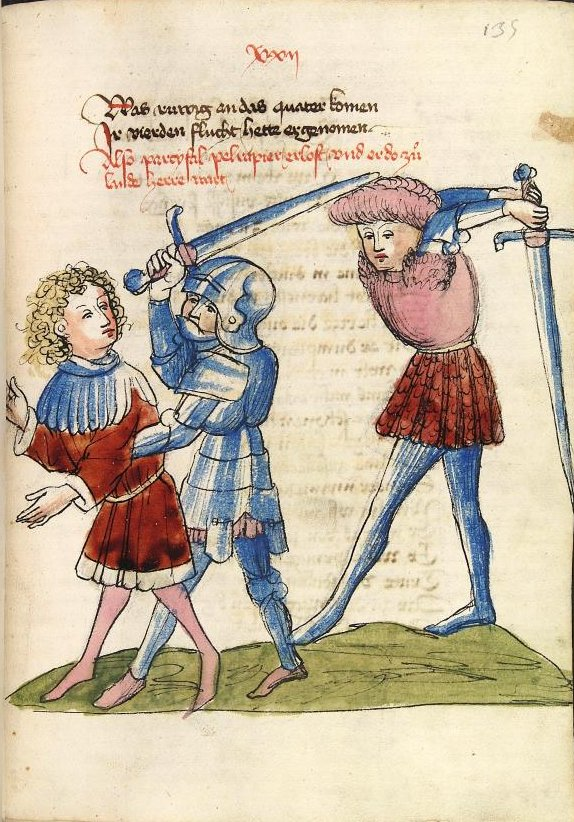
1440s illustration of one- and two-handed use of the longsword. Note the sword being used one-handed is drawn shorter and may also be intended as a large knightly sword (CPG 339 fol. 135r).

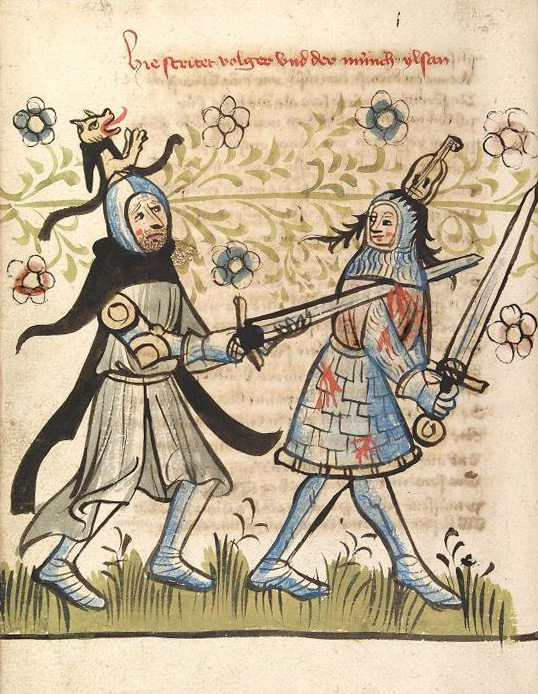
Example of two handed use vs. half-sword, dating to c. 1418 (CPG 359, fol. 46v)

Codified systems of fighting with the longsword existed from the later 14th century, with a variety of styles and teachers each providing a slightly different take on the art. Hans Talhoffer, a mid-15th-century German fightmaster, is probably the most prominent, using a wide variety of moves, most resulting in wrestling. The longsword was a quick, effective, and versatile weapon capable of deadly thrusts, slices, and cuts. The blade was generally used with both hands on the hilt, one resting close to or on the pommel. The weapon may be held with one hand during disarmament or grappling techniques. In a depiction of a duel, individuals may be seen wielding sharply pointed longswords in one hand, leaving the other hand open to manipulate the large dueling shield.

Another variation of use comes from the use of armour. Half-swording was a manner of using both hands, one on the hilt and one on the blade, to better control the weapon in thrusts and jabs. This versatility was unique, as multiple works hold that the longsword provided the foundations for learning a variety of other weapons including spears, staves, and polearms. Use of the longsword in attack was not limited only to use of the blade, however, as several Fechtbücher explain and depict use of the pommel and cross as offensive weapons. The cross has been shown to be used as a hook for tripping or knocking an opponent off balance. Some manuals even depict the cross as a hammer.

What is known of combat with the longsword comes from artistic depictions of battle from manuscripts and the Fechtbücher of Medieval and Renaissance Masters. Therein the basics of combat were described and, in some cases, depicted. The German school of swordsmanship includes the earliest known longsword Fechtbuch, a manual from approximately 1389, known as GNM 3227a. This manual, unfortunately for modern scholars, was written in obscure verse. It was through students of Liechtenauer, like Sigmund Ringeck, who transcribed the work into more understandable prose that the system became notably more codified and understandable. Others provided similar work, some with a wide array of images to accompany the text.

The Italian school of swordsmanship was the other primary school of longsword use. The 1410 manuscript by Fiore dei Liberi presents a variety of uses for the longsword. Like the German manuals, the weapon is most commonly depicted and taught with both hands on the hilt. However, a section on one-handed use is among the volume and demonstrates the techniques and advantages, such as sudden additional reach, of single-handed longsword play. The manual also presents half-sword techniques as an integral part of armoured combat.

Both schools declined in the late 16th century, with the later Italian masters forgoing the longsword and focusing primarily on rapier fencing. The last known German manual to include longsword teaching was that of Jakob Sutor, published in 1612. In Italy, spadone, or longsword, instruction lingered on despite the popularity of the rapier, at least into the mid-17th century (Alfieri's Lo Spadone of 1653), with a late treatise of the "two handed sword" by one Giuseppe Colombani, a dentist in Venice dating to 1711. A tradition of teaching based on this has survived in contemporary French and Italian stick fighting.

=== German school of fencing ===
==== Bloßfechten ====
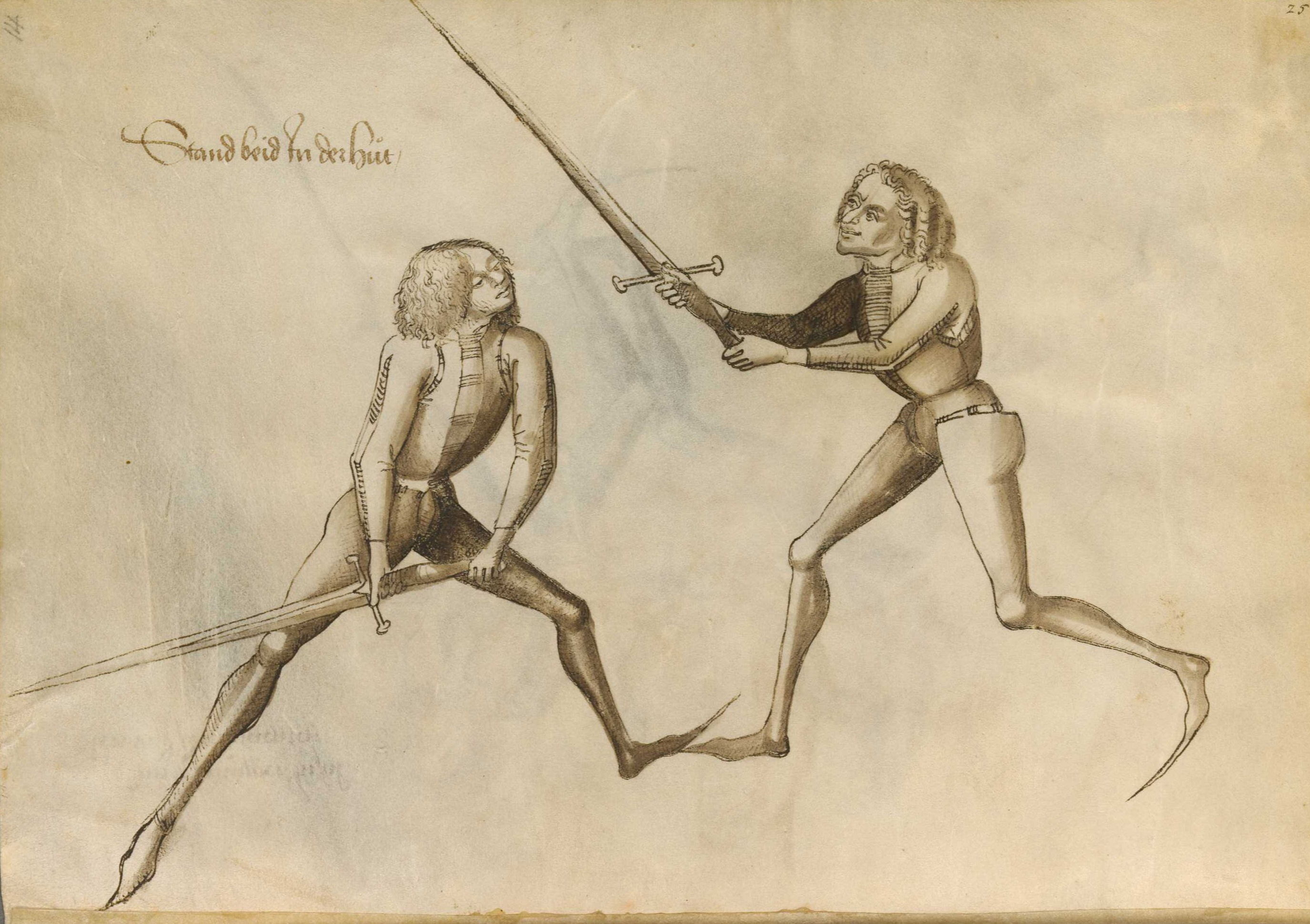
Unarmoured longsword fencers (plate 25 of the 1467 manual of Hans Talhoffer)

Bloßfechten (blosz fechten) or "bare fighting" is the technique of fighting without significant protective armour such as plate or mail.

The lack of significant torso and limb protection leads to the use of a large amount of cutting and slicing techniques in addition to thrusts. These techniques could be nearly instantly fatal or incapacitating, as a thrust to the skull, heart, or major blood vessel would cause massive trauma. Similarly, strong strikes could cut through skin and bone, effectively amputating limbs. The hands and forearms are a frequent target of some cuts and slices in a defensive or offensive manoeuvre, serving both to disable an opponent and align the swordsman and his weapon for the next attack.

==== Harnischfechten ====
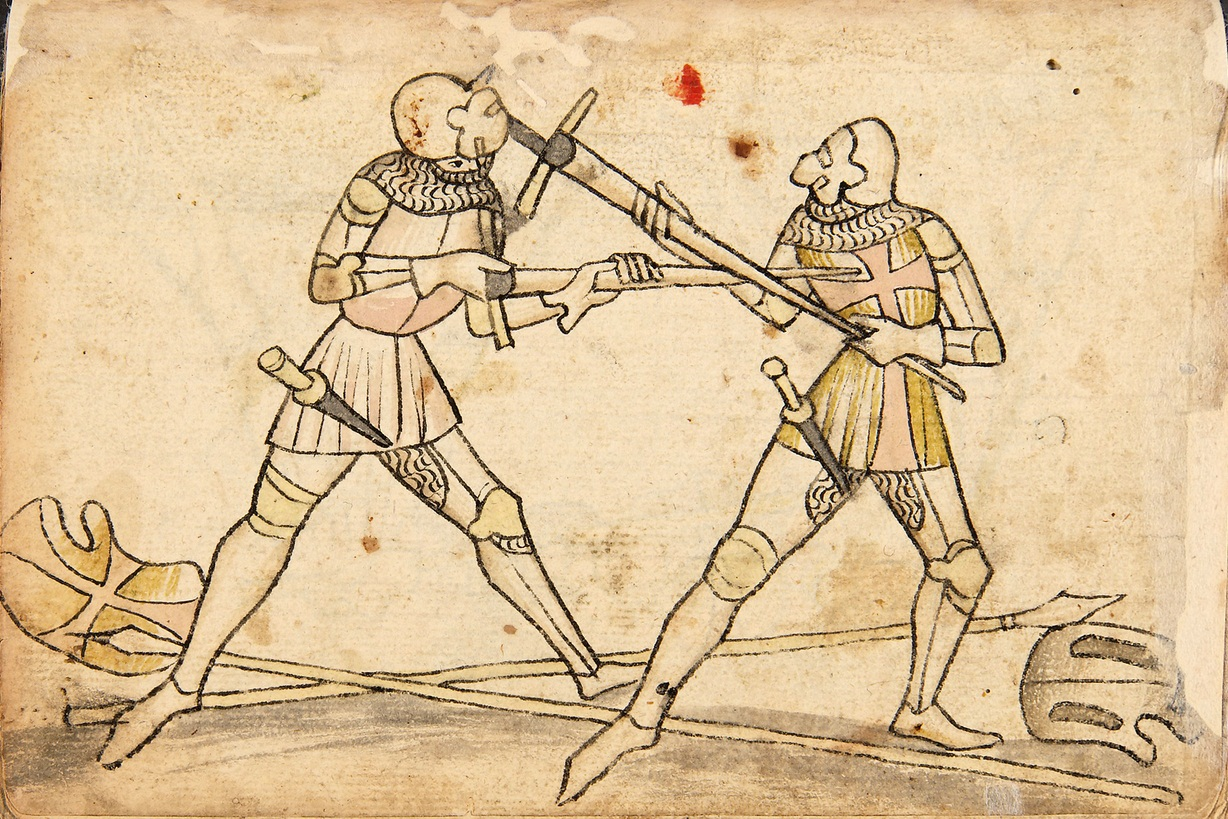
Page of the Codex Wallerstein showing a half-sword thrust against a two-handed sword's Mordstreich (Plate 214)

Harnischfechten, or "armoured fighting" (German kampffechten, or Fechten in Harnisch zu Fuss, literally "fighting in armour on foot"), depicts fighting in full plate armour.

The increased defensive capability of a man clad in full plate armour caused the use of the sword to be drastically changed. While slashing attacks were still moderately effective against infantry wearing half-plate armour, cutting and slicing attacks against an opponent wearing plate armour were almost entirely ineffective in providing any sort of slashing wound as the sword simply could not cut through the steel, although a combatant could aim for the chinks in a suit of armour, sometimes to great effect. Instead, the energy of the cut becomes essentially pure concussive energy. The later hardened plate armours, complete with ridges and roping, posed a threat against the careless attacker. It is considered possible for strong blows of the sword against plate armour to damage the blade of the sword, potentially rendering it much less effective at cutting and producing only a concussive effect against the armoured opponent.

To overcome this problem, swords began to be used primarily for thrusting. The weapon was used in the half-sword, with one or both hands on the blade. This increased the accuracy and strength of thrusts and provided more leverage for Ringen am Schwert or "wrestling at/with the sword". Also, the hand on the blade increases its rigidity which is advantageous when thrusting. This technique combines the use of the sword with wrestling, providing opportunities to trip, disarm, break, or throw an opponent and place them in a less offensively and defensively capable position. During half-swording, the entirety of the sword works as a weapon, including the pommel and crossguard. One example how a sword can be used this way is to thrust the tip of the crossguard at the opponent's head right after parrying a stroke. Another technique would be the Mordstreich (lit. "murder stroke"), where the weapon is held by the blade (hilt, pommel and crossguard serving as an improvised hammer head) and swung, taking advantage of the balance being close to the hilt to increase the concussive effect (see the fighter on the right of the Codex Wallerstein picture).

== Longswords in popular culture ==
Longswords have featured prominently in popular culture, particularly within the fantasy genre, symbolizing honor, nobility, and combat prowess.

Notable examples include:

- Andúril, the reforged sword of Aragorn in The Lord of the Rings film series, derived from the shards of Narsil. It serves as a symbol of kingship and lineage.
- Excalibur, the mythical sword of King Arthur, has appeared in numerous literary and cinematic works. Often portrayed as a longsword.
- Ice, the ancestral greatsword of House Stark in the television adaptation of George R.R. Martin's A Song of Ice and Fire, known as Game of Thrones. It is portrayed as a massive Valyrian steel weapon passed down through generations.

== See also ==
- Estoc, a French name for a longsword variant
- Odachi, a type of traditionally made Japanese large sword
- Spatha, a Roman and early medieval long sword
- Zweihänder (German, "two-hander"), a late Renaissance long sword
- Montante, a Renaissance long sword
- English Longsword School
- Historical European martial arts
- Armored combat (sport)
