= Oettingen-Wallerstein library =

Oettingen-Wallerstein library (Oettingen-Wallersteinsche Bibliothek) is the former library of the princes of Oettingen-Wallerstein, now part of the collection of Augsburg University library.

It contains some 1,600 manuscripts, 1,300 incunabula, 1,800 musical mss., 600 musical prints, and 117,000 prints of the 16th to 19th centuries. The collection contains the five libraries of secularized Swabian monasteries Kirchheim am Ries, Maihingen, Mönchsdeggingen, Füssen (St. Mang) and Donauwörth. Besides this, bibliophile princes Kraft Ernst (1748–1802) and his son Ludwig (1791–1870) collected medieval manuscripts so avidly that the family fell into debt.

The medieval collection includes the 8th-century Echternach Evangeliary, the illustrated bible of Sancho el Fuerte (1190), and a Frankish psalter of the 13th century, fencing and tournament books of the 15th to 16th centuries, and a horoscope by Nostradamus for Rudolf II, Holy Roman Emperor, .

In 1816, a total of 4,500 manuscripts and early prints were combined to form a "medieval library" open to the public in Wallerstein. The library was moved to Maihingen in 1841; after World War II, it was stored in Harburg castle until 1980, when it was sold to the State of Bavaria for 40 million DM and incorporated into Augsburg University library.
