= Half-sword =

Sword technique

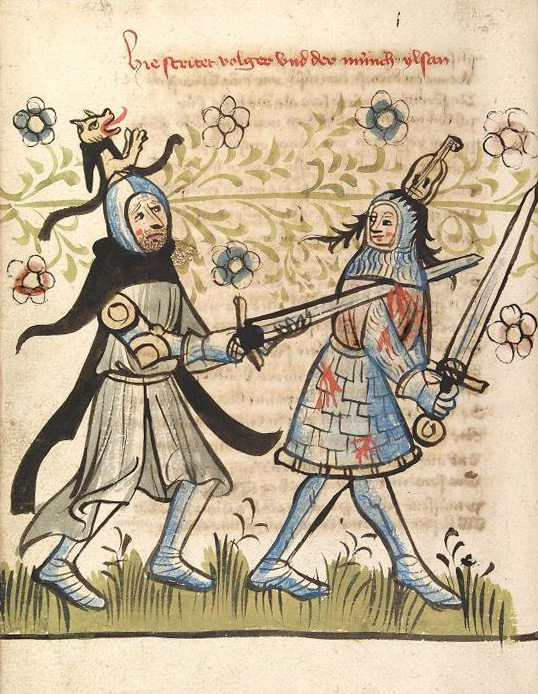
Example of an illustration of half-sword, c. 1418: Islan the monk executes a half-sword thrust against Volker the minstrel (CPG 359, fol. 46v).

Half-sword, in 14th- to 16th-century fencing with longswords, refers to the technique of gripping the central part of the sword blade with the left hand in order to execute more forceful thrusts against armoured and unarmoured opponents. The term is a translation of the original German Halbschwert. The technique was also referred to as mit dem kurzen Schwert, "with the shortened sword" in German.

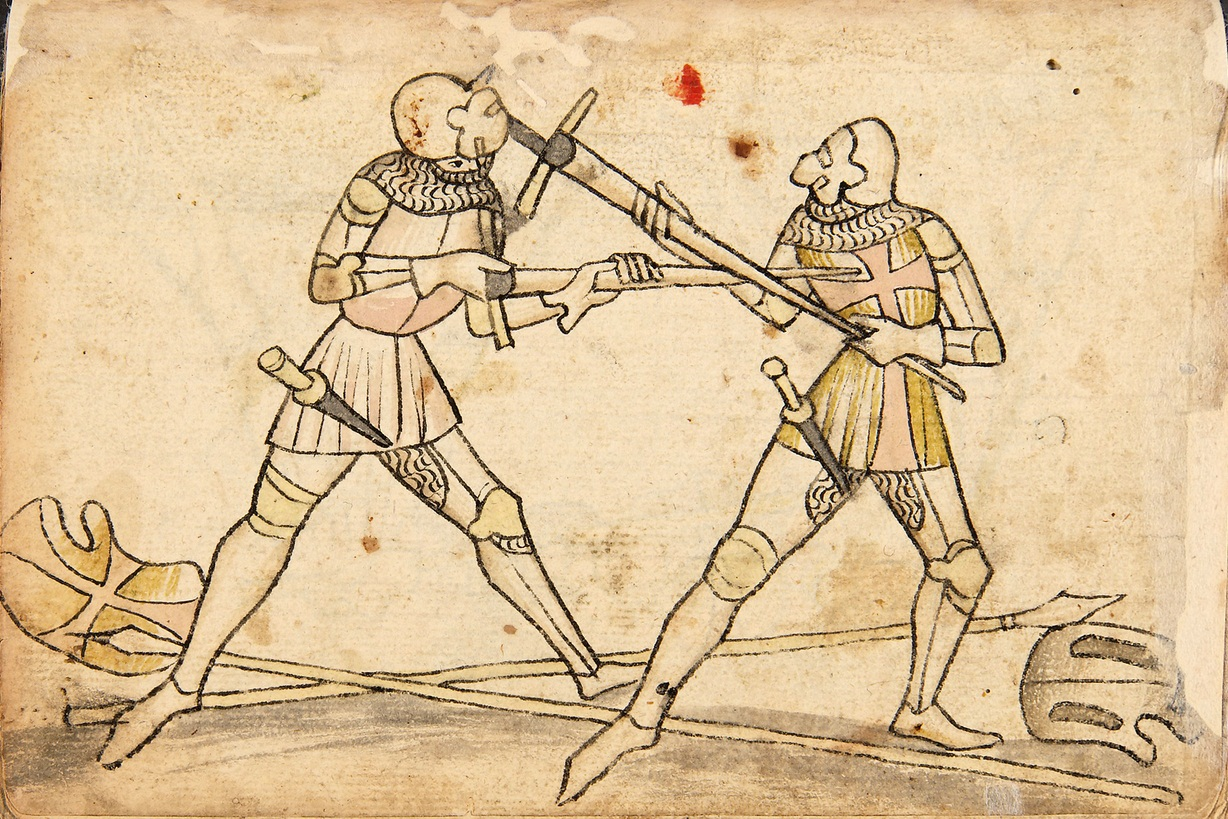
Page of the Codex Wallerstein showing a half-sword thrust against a Mordhau (Plate 214)

Half-sword is used to leverage advantage when wrestling with the sword, as well as for delivering a more accurate and powerful thrust. Both of these are critical when fighting in plate armour because a slice or a cleaving blow from a sword is virtually useless against iron or steel plate. Most medieval treatises show armoured combat as consisting primarily of fighting at the half-sword; the best options against an armoured man being a strong thrust into less-protected areas such as the armpits or throat or, even better, the same against a man who has already been cast to the ground.

Some weapons may have been modified specifically for this purpose, sporting what is called a ricasso. Some longswords had a short ricasso, usually too close to the cross and hilt of the blade for practical use in half-swording except as a point of extra leverage in a thrust. The ricasso on larger swords, such as the two-handed sword, provided a longer area more fitting for gripping during half-swording. Filippo Vadi suggests that a sword be sharp only at the tip. It has been suggested that some swords were left unsharpened in a part of the sword a hand's breadth wide about halfway down the blade in order to facilitate this technique.

In Italian and English, "half sword" refers to a crossing of the sword in the middle of the blade, and by extension the relatively close range at which this takes place.
