= Mordhau (weaponry) =

Offensive technique

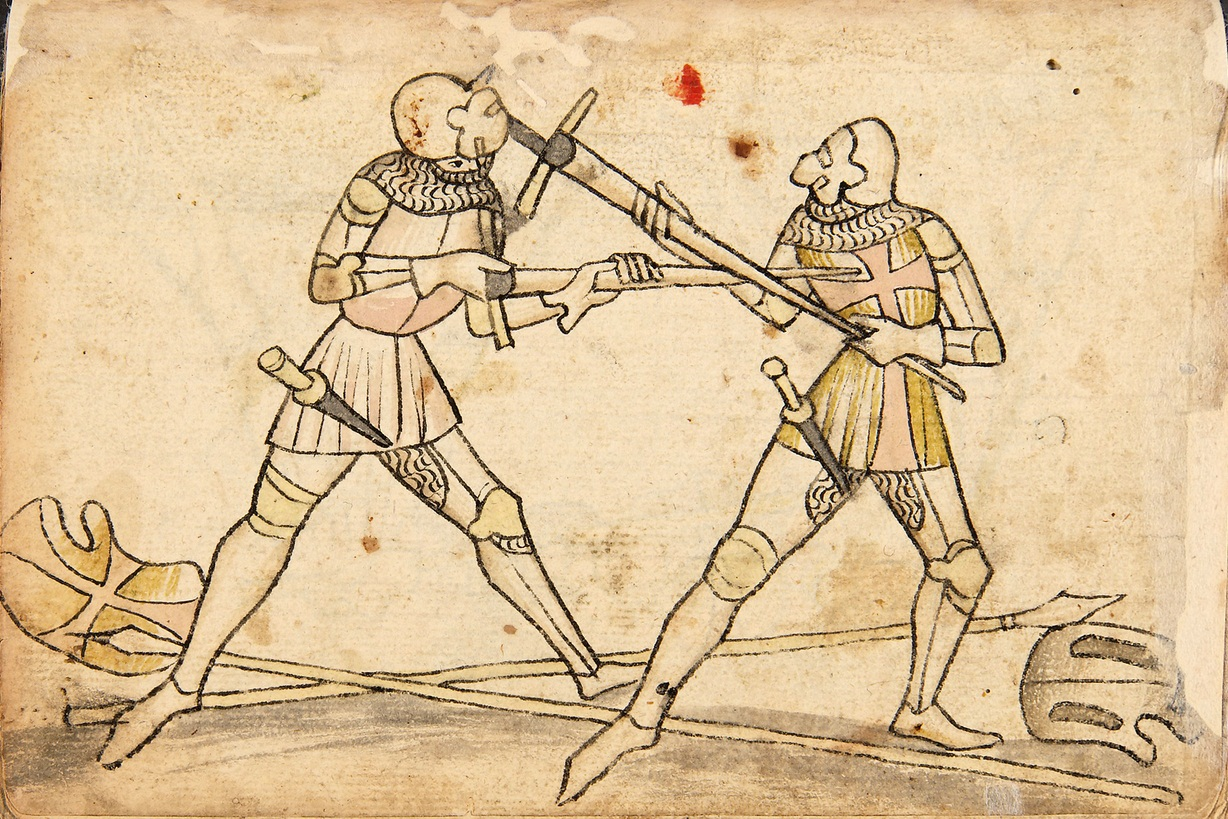
Page of the Codex Wallerstein showing a half-sword thrust against a Mordhau move (Plate 214)

In the German school of swordsmanship, Mordhau, alternatively Mordstreich or Mordschlag (in German literally "murder-stroke" or "murder-strike" or "murder-blow"), is a half-sword technique of holding the sword inverted, with both hands gripping the blade, and hitting the opponent with the pommel or crossguard. This technique allows the swordsman to essentially use the sword as a mace or hammer. The Mordhau is mainly used in armoured combat, although it can be used to surprise an opponent in close quarters. The sword is usually held (by right-handed people) with the left hand towards the tip of the sword and the right hand towards the crossguard. The opposite hand position was rare.

Cuts or blows with a sword blade were ineffective against plate armor from the 14th to 16th centuries. Cutting through the steel plates was infeasible, and a sword blade itself was too light to achieve a sufficient effect through its impact force alone, as is the case with weapons such as the much larger poleaxe as a specialized armored combat weapon.

== See also ==
- Buttstroke
- Pistol-whipping
