= Buttstroke =

Striking with the buttstock of a firearm

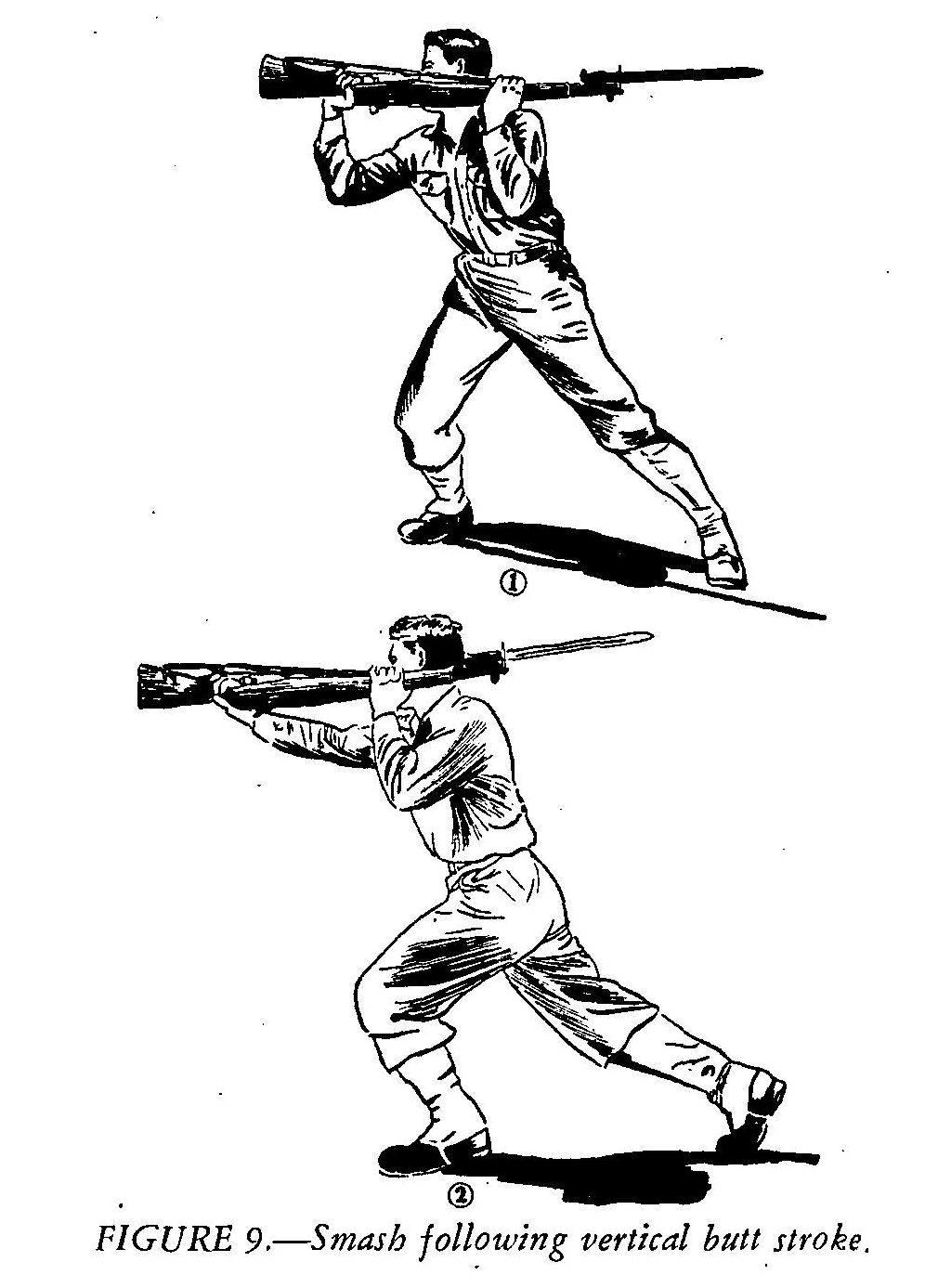
A World War II-era United States Army field manual depicting how to buttstroke someone

A buttstroke or butt-stroking is the act of striking someone with the buttstock of a long gun, and is one of the most common types of the use of firearms as blunt weapons. Buttstroking typically involves a longitudinal smash from the flat end of the buttstock into the opponent's head (typically the face) or upper body, in the fashion of a battering ram, although it can also involve holding the gun back-to-front and swinging it like a club, and some buttstocks are even intentionally made with wedge-shaped edges to concentrate force and make impacts resemble more like that of a splitting maul.

Buttstrokes are one of the two most prominent offensive techniques available when using long guns in hand-to-hand combat, the other being bayonet thrusts. It is the recommended method of close combat by the United States Marine Corps if no bayonet or sidearm is available.

== Effectiveness ==
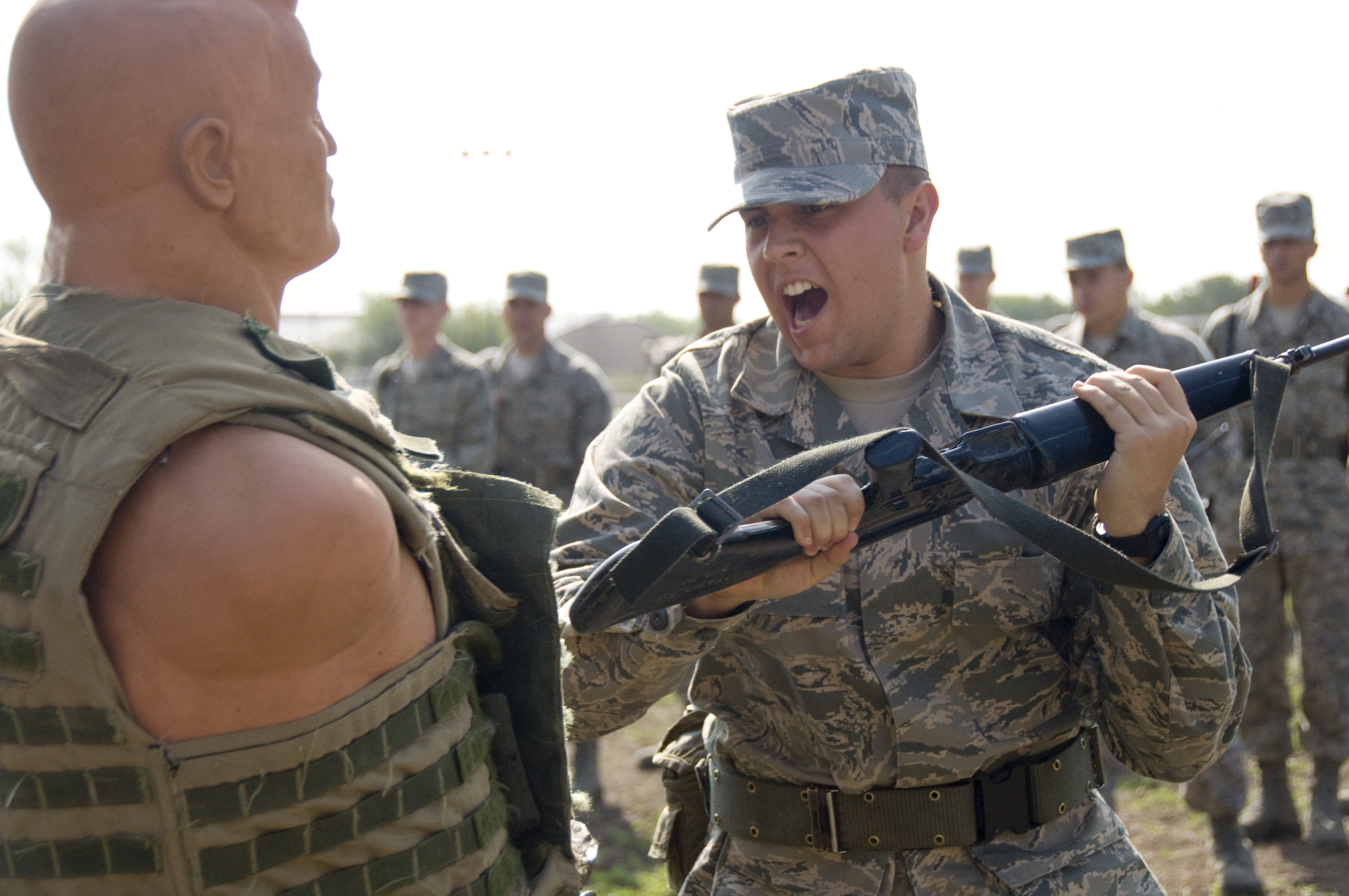
U.S. Air Force trainee demonstrating a butt stroke on a strike dummy

Despite technological changes, modern soldiers continue to report that hand-to-hand combat is a continued occurrence in the field, with soldiers stressing the importance of training in grappling and the use of weapons in hand-to-hand combat.

== Techniques ==
Buttstrokes are implemented by a variety of combatants, often trained in a series of transitioned movements to prevent wasted motion and ensure that the aggressor is able to make repeated attacks or quickly parry or guard following a failed attempt. Buttstrokes can be combined with kicking and kneeing an opponent's lower body to further increase effectiveness and provide more variety to routes of attack.

Buttstrokes carry the risk of damaging one's weapon, and, by some schools of thought, are considered best a method of last resort, recommending the use of bayonets, if possible, when engaged in close quarters combat. Even if relying primarily on bayonets, a buttstroke may still prove effective as a transitional move following a failed bayonet charge, bringing the butt of the gun in a vertical, upward swing into the combatant's groin.

Part of the buttstroke training regimen involves hitting padded dummies, alongside working through drills with partners in order to avoid damaging one's weapon.

=== United States Techniques ===
The 1918 United States Navy Landing-force Manual describes the following techniques of buttstroking which would be adopted by the United States National Guard and other branches of the military:

==== Trench or Vertical Butt Strokes ====
- Buttstroke I – Upward swing: Swing the butt up at the opponent's crotch, ribs, forearm, etc.,-using a half-arm blow or advancing the rear foot. Buttstroke I is essentially a half-arm blow from the shoulder, keeping the elbow rigid, and it can therefore be successfully employed only when the right hand is grasping the rifle at the small of the stock.
- Buttstroke II – Forward strike: If the opponent jumps back so that the first butt stroke misses, the rifle will come into a horizontal position over the left shoulder, butt leading; the attacker will then step in with the rear foot and dash the butt into his opponent's face.
- Buttstroke III – Downward cut: If the opponent retires still further out of distance, the attacker again closes up and slashes his bayonet down on his opponent's head or neck.
- Buttstroke IV – Side blow: If a thrust has been made at an opponent and parried, the butt can be effectively used by stepping in with the rear foot swinging the rifle to the left and rear, so that the butt leads and is in front of the right forearm. Then dash the butt into the opponent's face, or against the side of his head or jaw. When the opponent is out of distance, butt stroke III can again be used. In individual fighting, the butt can also be used horizontally against the opponent's ribs, forearm, etc. This method is impossible in trench fighting or in an attack, owing to the horizontal sweep of the bayonet to the attacker's left.

==== Open Ground or Horizontal Butt Strokes ====
- Buttstroke I – Advancing the rear foot, with a half-arm blow swing the butt up at the opponent's jaw with your right hand holding onto the small of the stock.
- Buttstroke II – If the opponent jumps back, causing the first stroke to miss, the rifle will come into a horizontal position over the left shoulder, butt leading. The attacker will then step in with the rear foot and slash the bayonet into the opponent's face.

== See also ==
- Bayonet charge
- Gunstock war club
- Hardtack – A hard biscuit historically eaten by soldiers, who sometimes softened it with a buttstroke
- Mordhau (weaponry)
- Pistol-whipping
- Glossary of firearms terms
