= CPG 339 =

Illustrated manuscript of Wolfram von Eschenbach's Parzival

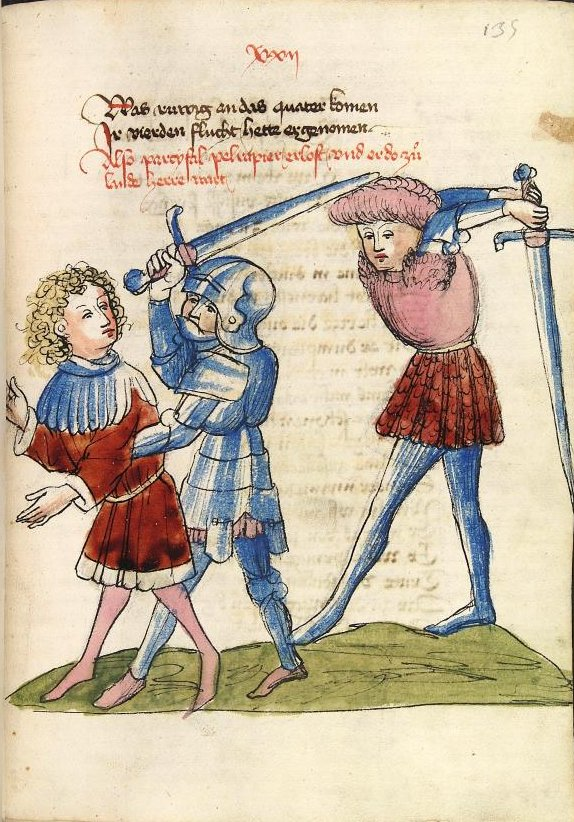
fol. 135r

The Cod. Pal. germ. 339 (CPG 339) is an illustrated manuscript of Wolfram von Eschenbach's Parzival, created in Hagenau in the 1440s in the workshop of Diebold Lauber.
