= Echternach Evangeliary =

Echternach Evangeliaria (Echternacher Evageliarien) is the name given to a number of notable medieval evangeliaria produced in Echternach abbey:

- the evangeliary of St. Willibrord, an insular ms. made ca. 690, now BNF Lat. 9389.
- another evangeliary associated with St. Willibrord, made c. 710, now in Augsburg University library
- an insular evangeliary of the early 8th century, made either in Echternach or Trier, now kept in Trier cathedral
- Codex aureus Epternacensis of the Ottonian period (mid 11th century), now GNM Hs. 156 142, Nuremberg
- Golden Gospels of Henry III, an Ottonian ms. of c. 1043–1046, now Escorial, Cod. Vitr. 17, Madrid.
