= CPG 359 =

Illustrated manuscript

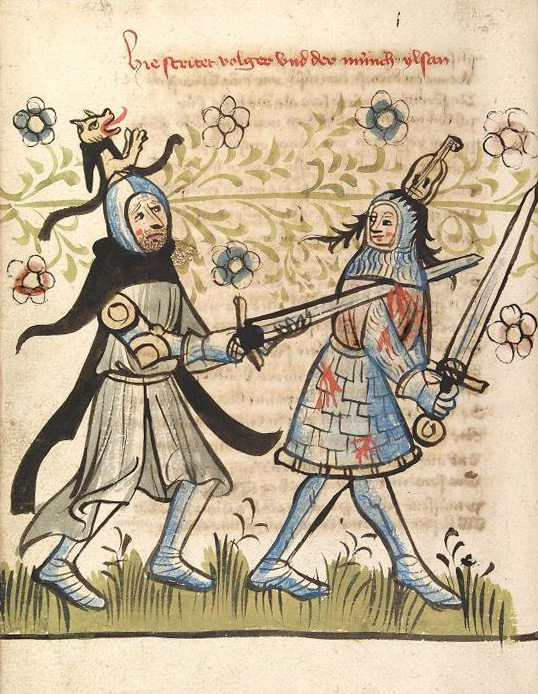
Duel of Volker the minstrel and Islan the monk (hie stritet volger vnd der münch ylsan), fol. 46v.

The Cod. Pal. germ. 359 (CPG 359) is an illustrated manuscript created in Strasbourg ca. 1418. It contains the texts Rosengarten zu Worms and Lucidarius.
