= List of active separatist movements in Oceania =

This is a List of currently active separatist movements in Oceania. Separatism includes autonomism and secessionism.

== Criteria ==
What is and is not considered an autonomist or secessionist movement is sometimes contentious. Entries on this list must meet three criteria:

1. They are active movements with active members.
2. They are seeking greater autonomy or self-determination for a geographic region (as opposed to personal autonomy).
3. They are citizens/people of the conflict area and do not come from another country.

Under each region listed is one or more of the following:

- De facto state (de facto entity): for unrecognized regions with de facto autonomy.
- Proposed state: proposed name for a seceding sovereign state.
- Proposed autonomous area: for movements towards greater autonomy for an area but not outright secession.
  - De facto autonomous government: for governments with de facto autonomous control over a region.
  - Government-in-exile: for a government based outside of the region in question, with or without control.
  - Political party (or parties): for political parties involved in a political system to push for autonomy or secession.
  - Militant organisation(s): for armed organisations.
  - Advocacy group(s): for non-belligerent, non-politically participatory entities.
  - Ethnic/ethno-religious/racial/regional/religious group(s).

== Australia ==
Aboriginal Australians

- Proposed states or autonomous areas: Northern Territory, Murrawarri Republic, Yidindji Tribal Nation, Euahlayi People's Republic, Torres Strait Islands, Republic of Mbarbaram, Wiradjuri Central West Republic, Mirrabooka Sovereign United Nations, Djurin Republic, and others
  - Political parties: Indigenous-Aboriginal Party of Australia
  - Advocacy groups: Aboriginal Tent Embassy, Australian Indigenous sovereignty, Sovereign Union of First Nations and Peoples in Australia, Tasmanian Aboriginal Centre, Aboriginal Provisional Government, Yuggera Ugarapul Tribal People's, and others

Norfolk Island

- Proposed state or autonomous area: Norfolk Island
  - Political parties: Norfolk Island Party, Norfolk Island People for Democracy

Western Australia

- Proposed state: Western Australia
  - Political party: Small Business Party

Victoria

- Proposed state: Victoria
  - Political party: Victorian Independence Movement

North Queensland

- Proposed: creation of a State of North Queensland
  - Political party: Katter's Australian Party

Riverina

- Proposed: creation of a State of Riverina
  - Political party: Riverina State Party

== Chile ==
Easter Island

Rapa Nui

- Proposed state: Rapa Nui
  - Ethnic group: Rapa Nui people

== Fiji ==
Nadroga-Navosa

- Proposed state: Nadroga-Navosa Sovereign Christian State

Ra

- Proposed state: Ra Sovereign Christian State

Rotuma

- Proposed autonomous region: Rotuma
  - Advocacy group: Rotuma Council
  - Ethnic group: Rotumans

Vanua Levu

- Proposed: autonomy for Vanua Levu

Ono-i-Lau

- Ethnic group: Lauans
  - Proposed: independence for Ono-i-Lau

Tovata

- Proposed state: Tovata

Ba Province

- Proposed state: Yasayasa Vaka Ra

== France ==
French Polynesia

Tahiti

- Proposed state or autonomous region: Tahiti or Kingdom of Tahiti
  - Political party (secessionist): Tavini Huiraatira
  - Political parties (autonomist): A here ia Porinetia, ʻĀmuitahiraʻa o te Nūnaʻa Māʻohi, Ia Ora te Nuna'a, Tāpura Huiraʻatira, No Oe E Te Nunaa

Pakumotu Republic

- Proposed state: Pakumotu Republic

New Caledonia

New Caledonia

- Proposed state: New Caledonia or Kanaky
  - Political parties: Kanak and Socialist National Liberation Front, Caledonian Union, Party of Kanak Liberation, Kanak Socialist Liberation, Labour Party, Federation of Pro-Independence Co-operation Committees, Renewed Caledonian Union, Oceanian Democratic Rally, Melanesian Progressive Union
  - Ethnic groups: Kanaks, Caldoche

Marquesas Islands

- Proposed state: Marquesas Islands
  - Advocacy group: island chiefs of Marquesas Islands
  - Ethnic group: Marquesans

== Indonesia ==
Map of native ethnic groups of Indonesia. Foreign ethnic groups are not shown.

West Papua

- Proposed state: West Papua
  - Government-in-exile: Republic of West Papua (member of the UNPO)
  - Militant organisation: Free Papua Movement, West Papua National Liberation Army
  - Advocacy group: United Liberation Movement for West Papua
  - Ethnic group: Papuans

== New Zealand ==
South Island

South Island

- Proposed state: South Island, New Munster Province
  - Political party: South Island Independence Movement
  - Advocacy group: South Island First

Cook Islands

- proposed state: Cook Islands
  - Political party: Cook Islands Party
  - Ethnic group: Cook Islanders

Tokelau

- Proposed state: Tokelau
  - Ethnic group: Tokelauans

Chatham Islands

- Proposed: autonomy for the Chatham Islands

== Papua New Guinea ==
Autonomous Region of Bougainville

- Proposed state: Bougainville
  - Political parties: Bougainville Independence Movement, Bougainville Labour Party, Bougainville People's Congress, New Bougainville Party, Bougainville Islands Unity Party

New Ireland

- Proposed State: New Ireland
  - Political party: Free New Ireland Party

Milne Bay

- Proposed autonomous area: Milne bay

East New Britain

- Proposed autonomous area: East New Britain

Hela

- Proposed autonomous area: Hela

East Sepik Province

- Proposed: autonomy for East Sepik Province

Morobe

- Proposed state: Morobe

== Micronesia ==
Chuuk

- Proposed state: Chuuk
  - Political party: Chuuk Independence Movement
  - Ethnic Group: Chuukeese

Yap

- Proposed autonomous area: Yap
  - Political party: Yap self determination Movement
  - Ethnic Group: Yapese

Faichuk Islands

- Proposed State: Faichuk

Kosrae

- Proposed state: Kosrae

Pohnpei

- Proposed state: Pohnpei

== Solomon Islands ==
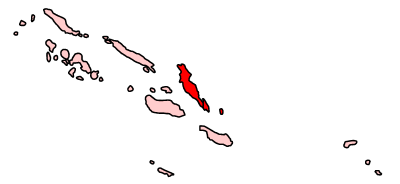
Malaita Province

Malaita Province

- Proposed state: Malaita
  - Political party: Malaita for Democracy

Choiseul Province

- Proposed state: Choiseul (Within Bougainville)

Western Province (Solomon Islands)

- Proposed: autonomy of Western Province (Solomon Islands)

== Tonga ==
Vavaʻu

- Ethnic group: Tongans
  - Proposed state: Vavaʻu

== United States ==
Hawaii

Hawaii

- Proposed autonomous area or state: Hawaii
  - Political party: Aloha ʻĀina Party
  - Advocacy groups: Nation of Hawaiʻi (organization), Office of Hawaiian Affairs, Ka Lāhui Hawaiʻi
  - Ethnic group: Native Hawaiians, Hapa, Haoles, Filipinos, Pākē, Kepanī, Okinawans

Guam

- Proposed state: Guam
  - Political party: Commission on Decolonization
  - Advocacy group: Chamorro Nation

== Vanuatu ==
Tafea Province

- Ethnic group: Tannese people
  - Proposed state: Tafea

== See also ==
- Lists of active separatist movements
- List of historical separatist movements
