= Clarrie Isaacs =

Australian Aboriginal activist

Clarrie Isaacs JP
- Born: 4 September 1948
- Died: 26 November 2003 (aged 55); Dunsborough, Western Australia
- Resting place: Karrakatta Cemetery
- Other names: Yaluritja; Ishak Mohamed
- Education: Perth Modern School
- Known for: Activism
- Children: Graham Isaacs, Naomi Isaacs, Amber Lankester Isaacs

Clarence Frederick "Clarrie" Isaacs, also known as Yaluritja and Ishak Mohamad Haj, (9 April 1948 – 26 November 2003) was an Aboriginal Australian activist.

== Life and career ==
Isaacs attended Perth Modern School, where he studied technical drawing. He later attended the Clyde Cameron College in Albury, a union-backed training centre. After converting to Islam Isaacs undertook a pilgrimage to Mecca, earning the right to use the honorific title Haj.

In the early 1990s Isaacs was among a number of activists, including Michael Mansell, who formed the Aboriginal Provisional Government. At various times Isaacs styled himself as the President of the Aboriginal Government. Isaacs, with other activists, travelled to Libya using Aboriginal passports issued by a group that later became known as the Aboriginal Provisional Government. Attempting to use the passports on their re-entry to Australia, they were initially refused entry to Australia by immigration officials.

Isaacs was a prominent figure in protests against development of the Swan Brewery site in Perth during the late 1980s. He was also prominent in efforts to return the pickled head of 19th century Noongar warrior Yagan from Britain.

In 1991 Isaacs was a founding member of the short-lived New Left Party, considered a successor of the Communist Party of Australia. In the 1993 Western Australian state election Isaacs stood for the Western Australian Legislative Assembly seat of Fremantle. Isaacs stood as a candidate for Racism No! in the 1996 Western Australian state election for the Legislative Council in the South Metropolitan Region. At the 2001 Australian federal election Isaacs was a candidate for the Australian Senate, however he only received 260 votes.

He was chairman of the Derbal Yerrigan Health Service and was a Western Australian delegate to the National Aboriginal Community Controlled Health Organisation. Isaacs was a justice of the peace.

Isaacs died 26 November 2003 in Dunsborough, Western Australia. He was buried on 12 December 2003 at Karrakatta Cemetery in Perth.
