= Proposals for new Australian states =

Territorial evolution of Australia

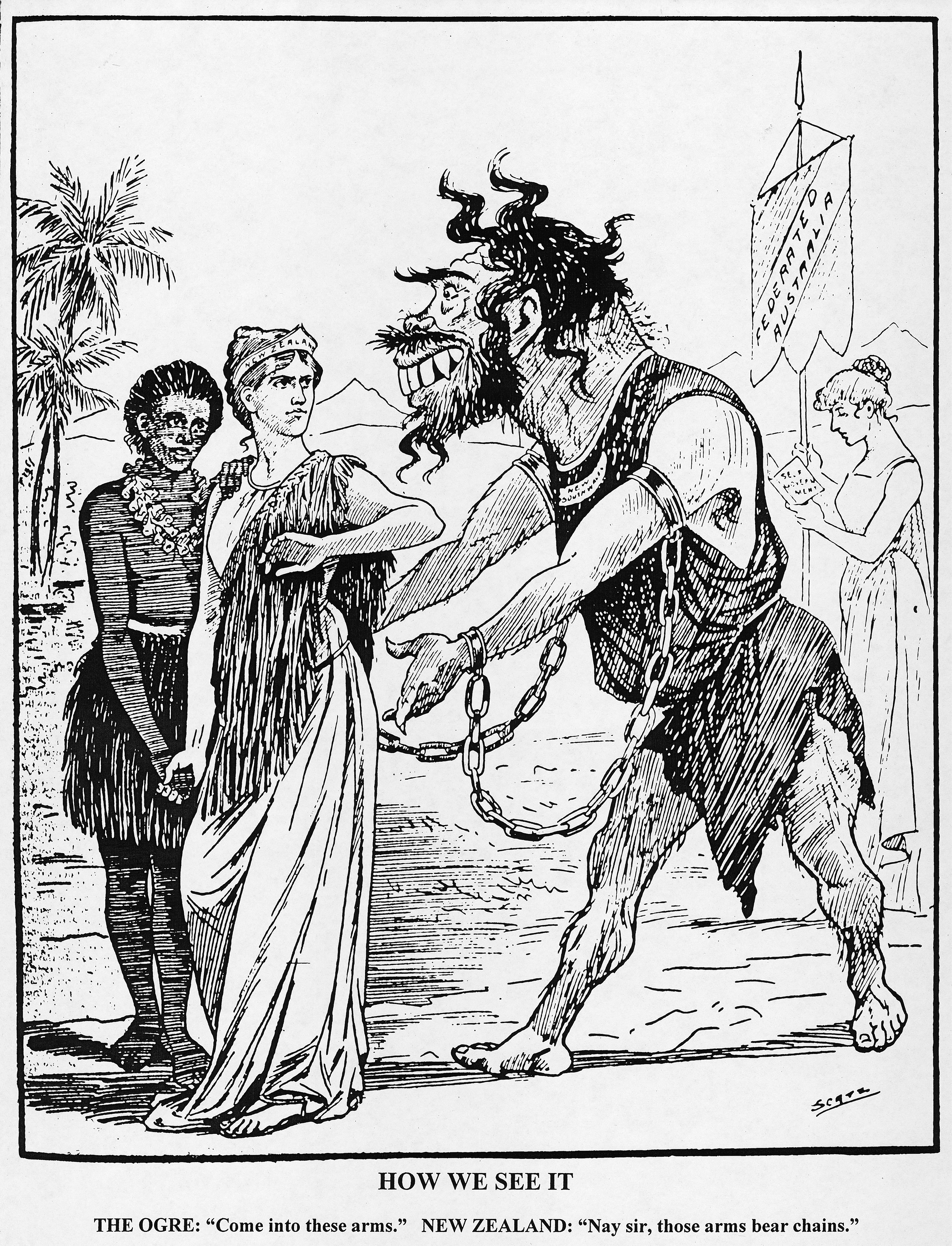
Political cartoon from 1900 that shows the colonies of New Zealand and Fiji rejecting the offer to join the Federation of Australia, with Zealandia referencing Australia's origins as a penal colony.

Since the 19th century, there have been proposals for the creation or incorporation of new states of Australia. Chapter VI of the Constitution of Australia provides for the admission of new states to the federation. Proposals have included admitting territories to statehood, admitting independent countries (or their dependent territories), and forming new states from parts of existing states. However, no new states have been added since the federation of six former British self-governing colonies in 1901, as states of the new Commonwealth of Australia.

Unofficial proposals have involved current territories, especially the Northern Territory (NT) and, to a lesser extent, the Australian Capital Territory (ACT). Other long-standing proposals have included negotiating the addition of neighbouring countries, such as New Zealand (as either one or two states), Papua New Guinea, Fiji and East Timor, and the creation of a state for Indigenous Australians.

== Procedure ==
Section 124 of the Constitution of Australia provides for the establishment or admission of new states to the federation. The Federal Parliament may also form a new state by separating territory from an existing state, join multiple states or parts of states, or increase, diminish, or otherwise alter the limits of a state, but in each case, it must have the approval of the parliament(s) of the state(s) in question. Section 123 provides that alterations to state boundaries also require the consent of the state's voters via referendum.

In relation to parliamentary representation, the Joint Select Committee on Electoral Reform in 1985 recommended that territories be entitled to:

- Separate representation from the ACT or NT once they have more than half a quota of population (for a House of Representatives seat);
- A floor of two senators for the ACT and NT each; and
- One extra senator for every two lower house members.
- That new states should not have representation any more favourable than Territories as prescribed in the Commonwealth Electoral Act 1918.

== History ==
=== Colonial period ===
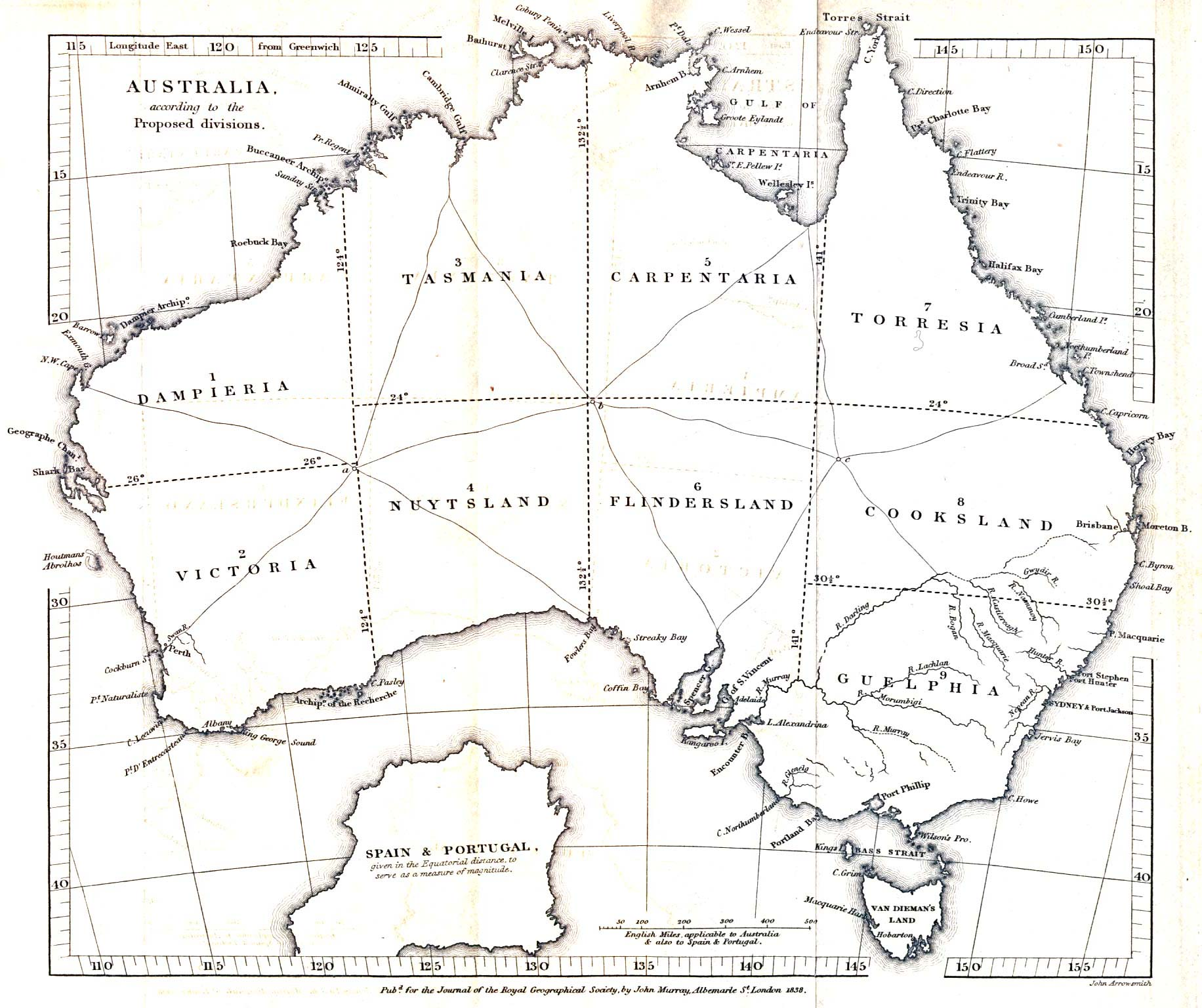
This map shows James Vetch's proposal for subdivisions of Australia from 1838. Note that although the names "Victoria" and "Tasmania" appear, both are geographically distant from the current states of the same name.

Immediately before federation in 1901, the Australian mainland comprised six separate British self-governing colonies. Throughout the 19th century, the borders of these colonies changed often, there were numerous proposals for new colonies and, in some instances, new colonies were gazetted, but later dissolved and incorporated (or reincorporated) into other colonies.

In 1838, British Army officer James Vetch proposed a major reorganisation of the colonial borders in the Journal of the Royal Geographical Society. These proposed colonies were geometric divisions of the continent, and did not take into account soil fertility, aridity or population. This meant that central and western Australia were divided into several states, despite their low populations both then and now.

For several months in 1846, a Colony of North Australia technically existed, with its capital at Gladstone. The short-lived colony officially included most of the future Queensland (except Brisbane and surrounding areas) and the future Northern Territory. Between the time it was gazetted, in February 1846 and the time it was officially cancelled, that December, the area of the new colony continued to be controlled by the government of New South Wales; at no point did a separate colonial administration of North Australia take control of it.

There was also a proposal in 1857 for the "Seven United Provinces of Eastern Australia" with separate provinces of Flinders Land, Leicharts (sic) Land (taken from the name of Ludwig Leichhardt) and Cooks Land in modern day Queensland (also named from James Cook).

=== 20th century ===
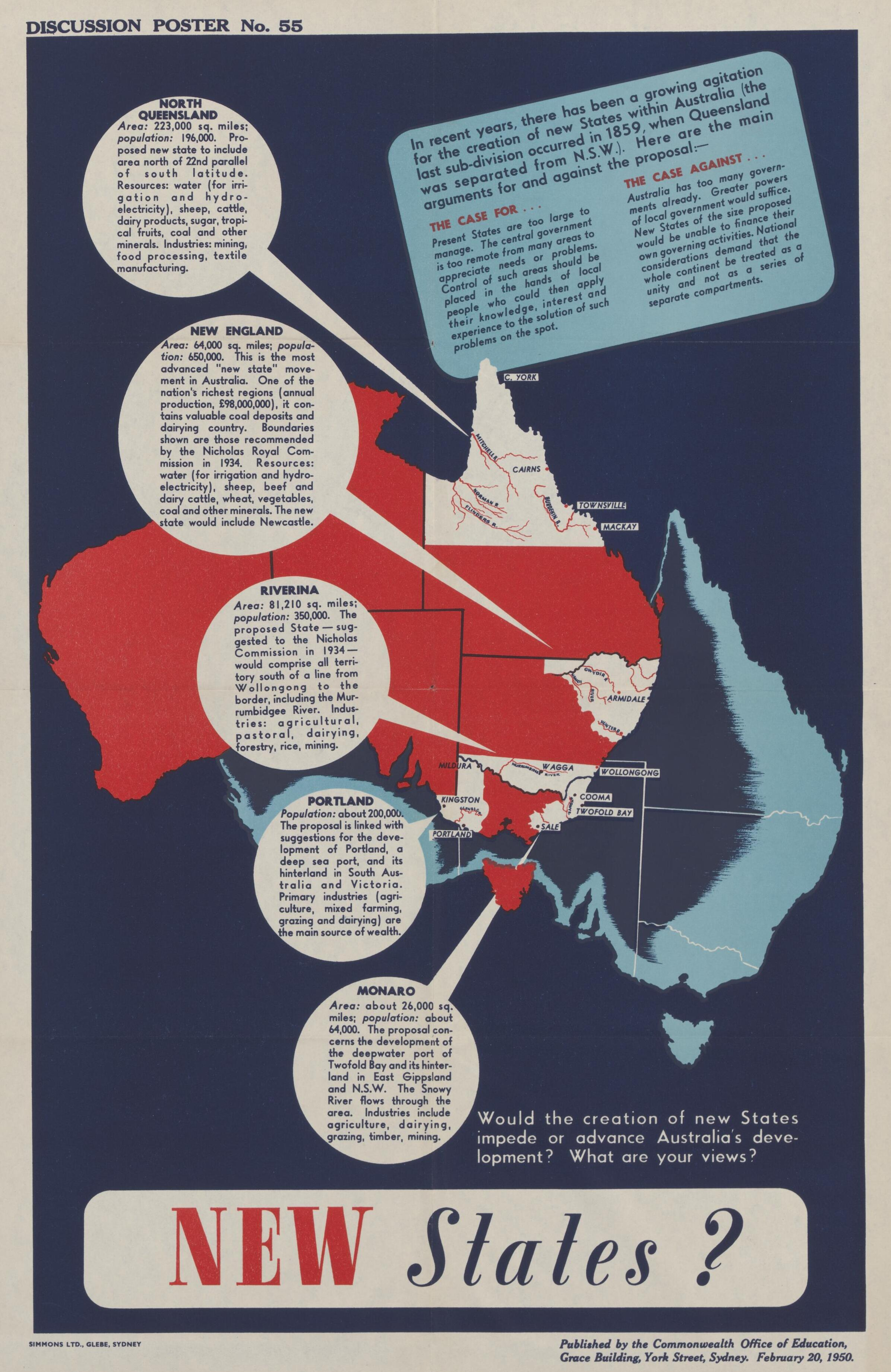
1950 poster showing contemporary proposals for new states

New statism was a major political force in Australia during the interwar period, calling for the creation of multiple new states in New South Wales and Queensland. Its popularity coincided with the emergence of the Country Party as a national party advocating decentralisation and promotion of new states as part of more general reform of Australia's federal structure, rather than as isolated movements for individual new states.

In 1924, following lobbying from the Country Party-aligned Progressives led by Michael Bruxner, New South Wales premier George Fuller appointed a royal commission into new states. The New States Royal Commission of Inquiry, led by John Cohen and known as the Cohen Royal Commission, examined proposals for new states in the Monaro, New England and the Riverina. Its report delivered in 1925 concluded that the proposed new states would be not financially feasible and that the benefits of decentralisation could be delivered by the existing state government.

While new states on the mainland were considered non-feasible, there was motivation to expand beyond the original Federation states. Described by Prime Minister Billy Hughes as the "Australian Monroe Doctrine", in the early 1900s early Federation politicians were motivated to expand Australia's presence in the Pacific islands through British transfers and annexations. Motivations for this policy included developing a strategic defensive 'ring' in case of an invasion of the Australian mainland, and to access cheap labour following the outlawing of blackbirding. Australian politicians lobbied the United Kingdom for acquisitions of British New Guinea, Colony of Fiji and British Solomon Islands, the French Tahiti, New Hebrides, and New Caledonia, and the German Marshall Islands. British New Guinea was transferred to Australia in 1902, becoming the Territory of Papua.

Following the acquisition of Papua, Australia acquired or claimed authority over Norfolk Island, Nauru, Ashmore and Cartier Islands, Heard Island and McDonald Islands, New Guinea, Cocos (Keeling) Islands, Christmas Island, Coral Sea Islands, and Antarctica. However, none of these managed territories ultimately developed into states.

=== 21st century ===
Since 2000, proposals for reorganisation have continued to be put forward. For instance, in 2003, Bryan Pape suggested a reorganisation into about twenty states, each with Senate representation.

Republicanism, changing mineral wealth and tax distribution have been seen as reasons to revisit federation. Proposals include redivision between the local, state and federal levels of government, either consolidation or fragmentation. It has been argued that new technologies in service delivery are enablers of greater decentralisation or are a reason for greater efficiency in centralisation.

== Proposals from existing states and territories ==
=== Aboriginal state ===
There are supporters of an Aboriginal state, similar to Nunavut in Canada. The Aboriginal Provisional Government was established in 1990 for the purpose; Paul Coe sued the Commonwealth for Aboriginal sovereignty (Coe v Commonwealth [1979] HCA 68) and see Kevin Gilbert 'Treaty 88'. All advocated for an Aboriginal state. Agence France Presse (21 August 1998) claims Australia blocked a United Nations resolution calling for the self-determination of peoples, because it would have bolstered support for an Aboriginal state within Australia. Among those supporting such a state are the Council for Aboriginal Reconciliation.

=== Auralia ===
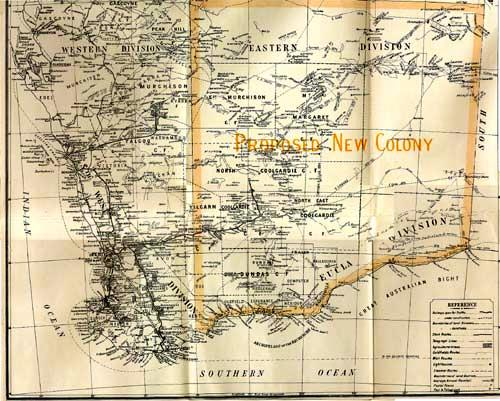
Map showing the proposed boundaries of the new Goldfields colony of "Auralia".

Proposed in the late 19th and early 20th centuries, the state of Auralia (meaning "land of gold") would have comprised the Western Australian Goldfields, the western portion of the Nullarbor Plain and the port town of Esperance. Its capital would have been Kalgoorlie.

However, the population in the modern region of Goldfields-Esperance is currently lower than that of the Northern Territory, and there is little evidence of recent support, although the idea of a state centred around Kalgoorlie was proposed in 2003.

=== Eyre Peninsula ===
In 1930, Robert Bedford and other wheatgrowers proposed that the Eyre Peninsula become a separate state from South Australia. A conference held in Kyancutta discussed the proposal, at which Bedford condemned Eyre Peninsula's "crushing disability of Absentee Centralism in Adelaide as well as Canberra". A proposed name for the new state was "Eyralia".

=== New England ===
The New England New State Movement was an Australian political movement in the twentieth century. Founded as the Northern Separation Movement, the aim of the movement was to seek the secession of the New England region and surrounding areas from the State of New South Wales (NSW) and the establishment of a new State of New England. While popular at first and the subject of two Royal Commissions, the movement was unsuccessful, and was defeated at a referendum in 1967.

=== North Queensland ===
One proposal is that Queensland should be divided by the 22nd parallel with the boundary running just south of Sarina on the coast to the Northern Territory border between Boulia and Mount Isa, and the capital would be Sellheim, near Charters Towers, to overcome rivalry between Mackay, Townsville and Cairns. The name Capricornia has been proposed for this state.

According to The Courier-Mail in 2010, the majority of North Queensland Mayors were in favour of the separation from Queensland proper. Only two of the hundred delegates at the NQ Local Government Association meeting were against the proposal – the two being Mayor Val Schier (Cairns) and Mayor Ben Callcott (Charters Towers).

=== Northern Territory ===
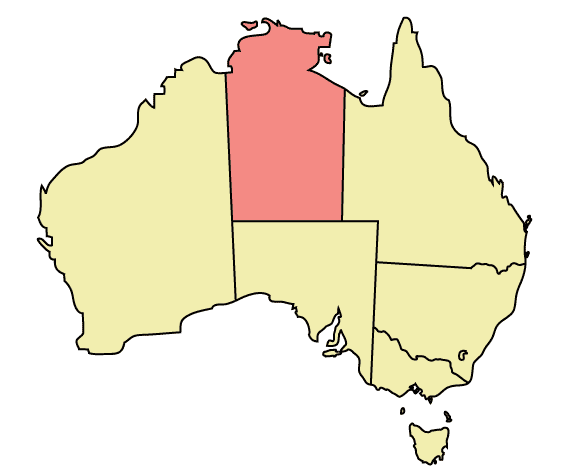
Size and location of the Northern Territory in relation to current Australian states.

The Northern Territory (NT) is the most commonly mentioned potential seventh state.

In a 1998 referendum, the voters of the Northern Territory narrowly rejected a statehood proposal that would have given the territory three senators, rather than the twelve held by the other states, although the name "Northern Territory" would have been retained.

With statehood being rejected, it is likely that the Northern Territory will remain a territory for the near future, though former Chief Minister Clare Martin and the majority of Territorians are said to be in favour of statehood.

While statehood would, under the conditions the original six states federated, give the Northern Territory 12 senators, its population as of 2021 is only 3% of the largest state, New South Wales. This means that whilst one NSW senator represents 682,000 people, one NT senator would represent approximately 21,000 people. By comparison, one Tasmanian senator represents 45,000 people, while one South Australian senator (next smallest state by population) represents 148,000 people. If the NT were only given 3 senators as proposed in the 1998 referendum, each would represent around 63,000 people.

An alternative name for the new state would be North Australia, which would be shared by two historic regions. The matter was raised again in July 2015, with a further referendum in 2018 being mooted.

=== Princeland ===
Princeland was a proposed colony of Australia that would have been formed by the western part of Victoria and the south-eastern part of South Australia. The movement began the early 1860s and resulted in a petition to Queen Victoria, which was ultimately rejected on the grounds that it would involve changes to two separate colonies and could not be done without their expressed permissions.

=== Riverina ===
Riverina is also a proposed state, in the Murray River region, on the border between New South Wales and Victoria. The Division of Riverina is currently a smaller area than traditional Riverina, which would include the Division of Farrer. Along with the ACT, it is one of the few landlocked proposed states.

In December 2020, there was a proposal by Northern Victoria MP Tim Quilty to form a new state from Northeastern Victoria and Southeastern New South Wales, because people in regional areas feel like they are neglected by their state governments. There was also a proposal to form three new states. They are: A new state comprising Greater Geelong and Metropolitan Melbourne; Regional Northeastern Victoria and Southeastern New South Wales combining, and Greater Sydney to become separate states.

Some supporters also propose a "River-Eden" state in the south of NSW and the north of Victoria, which, rather than being landlocked, would stretch eastwards to the coastal town of Eden.

=== South Coast ===
There was a small movement in the 1940s to create a new state in south-east New South Wales and north-east Victoria. The proposed state would have reached from Batemans Bay on the coast to Kiandra in the Snowy Mountains, and as far south as Sale in Victoria. The proposed state capital was Bega. Despite calls from local advocacy groups for a Royal Commission into the idea, it was met with little success.

== Proposals from other countries ==
=== Dutch New Guinea ===
In 1903, the Barton government requested that the British government seek the pre-emptive right for Australia to purchase Dutch New Guinea (then part of the Dutch East Indies) from the Netherlands, intending to prevent the possibility that the territory be sold to Germany. The Dutch government advised that the territory was not for sale.

A renewed Australian interest in Dutch New Guinea emerged in response to the Indonesian War of Independence and the Dutch–Indonesian Round Table Conference in 1949, which resulted in Dutch recognition of the United States of Indonesia but Dutch New Guinea remaining under the sovereignty of the Netherlands. In 1950, ALP opposition leader H. V. Evatt publicly urged the Menzies government to either purchase Dutch New Guinea from the Netherlands or seek a United Nations trusteeship administered by Australia, in order to prevent an Indonesian takeover. Gallup Polls conducted between 1950 and 1960 found that a plurality of Australians favoured western New Guinea being placed under Australian control or trusteeship, with one poll in 1958 finding that 47 percent of respondents favoured Australian control of the territory.

=== East Timor ===
During the process of Portuguese decolonisation in East Timor in 1974, a political party was formed called ADITLA (Associação Democratica para a Integração de Timor-Leste na Austrália, Democratic Association for the Integration of East Timor into Australia) by local businessman Henrique Pereira. It found some support from the ethnic Chinese community, fearful of independence or integration with Indonesia but was disbanded when the Australian government rejected the idea in 1975.

=== New Zealand ===
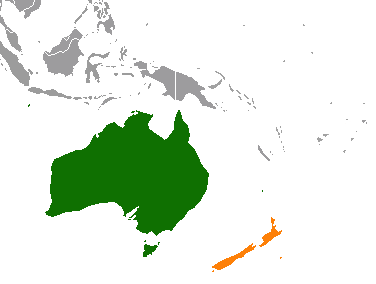
Australia and New Zealand

There have been proposals for New Zealand to become the seventh state of Australia. One proposal, suggested humorously by the Liberal Senator Ian Macdonald, is that New Zealand's North Island and South Island could become the seventh and eighth states of the Commonwealth. New Zealand was one of the colonies asked to join in the creation of the Commonwealth of Australia, even by the time the Commonwealth of Australia Constitution Act 1900 (Imp) was enacted, that law still provided for New Zealand to be one of the states of Australia.

==== History ====
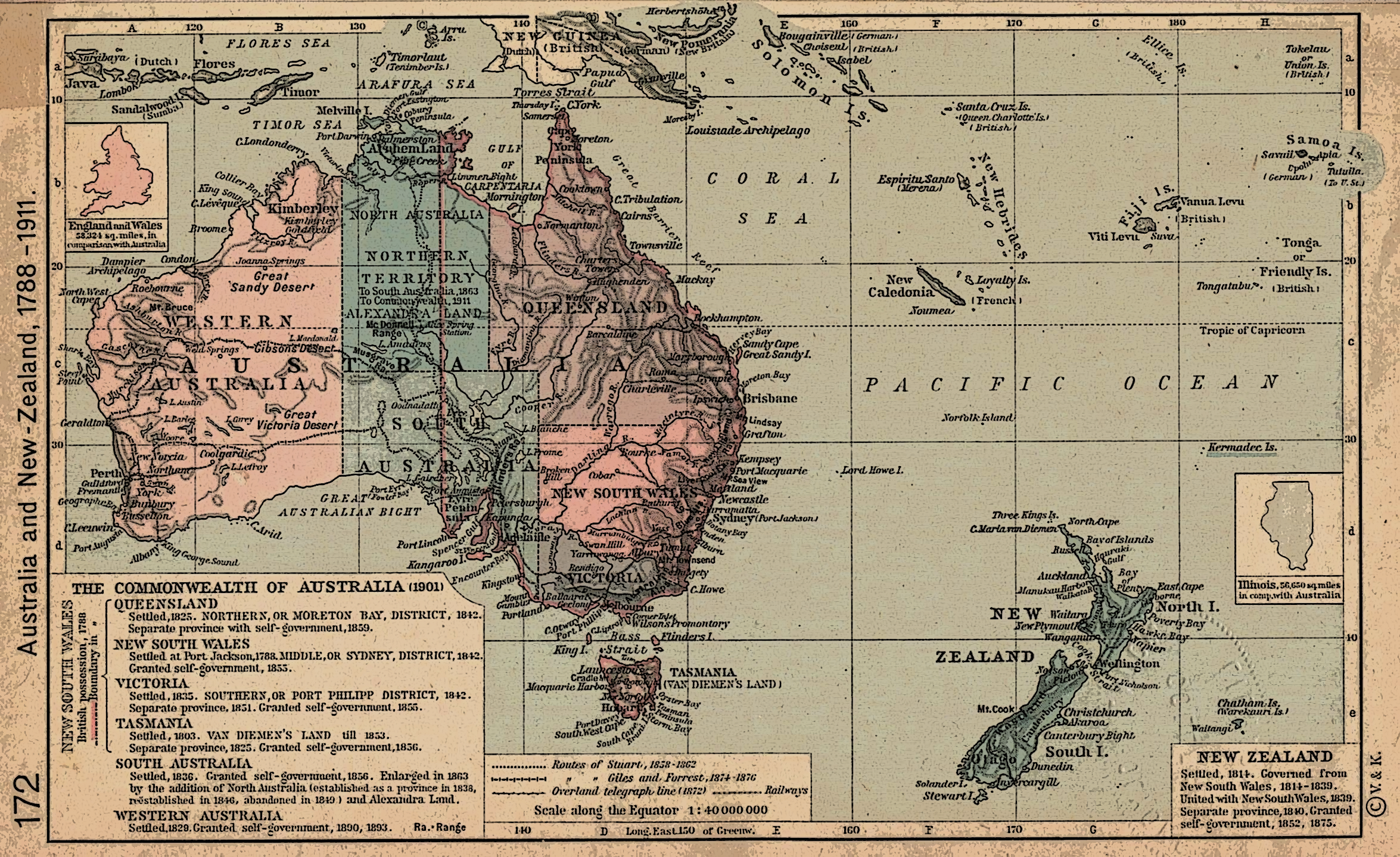
Historical map of Australia and New Zealand, 1923.

In 1788, Arthur Phillip became Governor of New South Wales. The Federal Council of Australasia was formed with members representing New Zealand, Victoria, Tasmania, South Australia and Fiji: it was a step into the establishing the Commonwealth of Australia.

In 1890, there was an informal meeting of members from the Australasian colonies, this was followed by the first National Australasian convention a year later. The New Zealand representatives stated it would be unlikely to join a federation with Australia at its foundation, but it would be interested in doing so at a later date. New Zealand's position was taken into account when the Constitution of Australia was written up. Australia, in an attempt to sway New Zealand to join, gave Māori the right to vote in 1902, while Australian Aboriginal people did not fully gain the right to vote at national elections until 1962. In 1908 and 1912, Australia and New Zealand sent Australasian teams to the Olympic Games. New Zealand and Australian soldiers fought together in 1915 under the name ANZAC.

Australian academic Bob Catley wrote a book titled Waltzing with Matilda: should New Zealand join Australia?, a book arguing that New Zealand should become one with Australia, which was described by New Zealand political commentator Colin James as "a book for Australians". In December 2006, an Australian Federal Parliamentary Committee recommended that Australia and New Zealand pursue a full union, or at least adopt a common ANZ currency and more common markets. The Committee found that "while Australia and New Zealand are of course two sovereign nations, it seems... that the strong ties between the two countries – the economic, cultural, migration, defence, governmental and people-to-people linkages – suggest that an even closer relationship, including the possibility of union, is both desirable and realistic." This was despite the Australian Treasurer Peter Costello and New Zealand Minister of Finance Michael Cullen saying that a common currency was "not on the agenda".

A 2010 UMR research poll asked 1000 people in Australia and New Zealand a series of questions relating to New Zealand's becoming the seventh state of Australia. One quarter of the people thought it was something to look into. Over 40% thought the idea was worth debating. More Australians than New Zealanders would support such a move.

In 2011, the Join Australia Movement Party in New Zealand advocated for political unity between New Zealand and Australia, dissolving the same year.

In 2023, during Labour MP Jamie Strange's valedictory speech, he said that New Zealanders "shouldn't rule... out" becoming one country with Australia.

==== Advantages ====
A leading factor for the proposal of New Zealand as a state of Australia is the major economic benefits it could bring. However, free trade and open borders now appear to be the maximum extent of public acceptance of the proposal. There are many family connections between the two nations, with around 500,000 New Zealanders living in Australia and 60,000 Australians living in New Zealand as of 2013. Peter Slipper, a former Member of Australia's Parliament, once said, "It's about how can we improve the quality of living for people on both sides of the Tasman" when referring to the proposal.

==== Disadvantages ====
Concerns have been expressed about the need for a common currency.

A number of disparities that could lead to conflict include the current constitutions (written in Australia, unwritten in New Zealand), and the status of political rights (constitutionally entrenched in Australia but not in New Zealand). Some New Zealanders feel they have established a national identity, one which they feel they may lose if they became part of Australia. Others argue New Zealand is too far away from the mainland of Australia.

=== Papua New Guinea ===
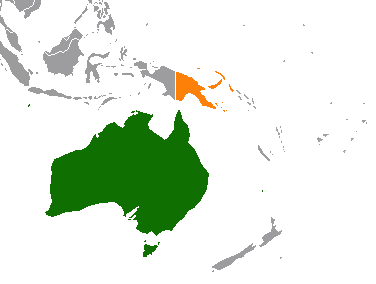
Size and location of Papua New Guinea in relation to Australia.

Emerging theories of the paleocontinent Sahul were used to justify Australia's colonisation of Papua New Guinea.

Papua New Guinea is physically closest of any country to geographically remote Australia, with some of the Torres Strait Islands (Boigu, Saibai, e.g.) just off the main island of the country.

Ownership of Papua New Guinea was a concern for the Australian politicians since before Federation. The territory was seen as a natural extension to the Australian colony, with the Territory only being 150km from mainland Australia, nearly half that of Tasmania (250km).

In 1883, the Colony of Queensland attempted to annex the east of the island of New Guinea, but ultimately rejected by the United Kingdom. The protectorate of British New Guinea was established by the United Kingdom, on the condition that the colonies of Australia would contribute to the cost, and that they would take it over following federation.

In November 1901, the newly federated Parliament of Australia passed a resolution authorising the government to accept control of British New Guinea from the United Kingdom and providing for interim funding. In 1902, in a motion authorising the handover of New Guinea, Australian parliamentarians debated whether British New Guinea should be admitted as a territory or state, with Alfred Deakin predicting "the long centuries for which I hope New Guinea is to be a territory, or, perhaps, a State of the Commonwealth."

The southern Territory of Papua became an Australian colony in 1902, and became officially organised into a territory government in 1905 following the Papua Act 1905. The northern Territory of New Guinea was seized by Australia from Germany in 1914 and administered as a "C" Mandate of the League of Nations from 1920. Both territories were amalgamated after Second World War into a single Australian colony of Territory of Papua and New Guinea.

In 1953, the editor of the conservative Quadrant magazine, Professor James McAuley, wrote that the territory would be "a coconut republic which would do little good for itself", and advocated its "perpetual union" with Australia, with "equal citizenship rights", but this was rejected by the Australian government.

Following a United Nations demand for Papua New Guinean self-governance, there was debate in the 1960s and early 1970s from within the Territory whether they should become an independent nation, or instead become Australia's seventh state. Minister for External Territories Charles Barnes drafted a proposed referendum on the topic of statehood and independence in 1966, but it was ultimately rejected by Cabinet. Amongst several issues, statehood would require a majority vote under a constitutional referendum, and that freedom of movement was out of question due to the White Australia Policy. A select committee of Indigenous people of New Guinea advocating a referendum were ultimately told by the Minister of Immigration Hubert Opperman that "Whites and blacks are completely different to each other to the extent that they can’t live as equals"

With the option of statehood unilaterally rejected by the federal Australian government, Papua New Guinea was granted self-government and full independence in 1975. Following independence, the Torres Strait Islands remained in Australian control due to its merger into the state of Queensland.

== See also ==
- 51st state
- Australia–New Zealand relations
- Australia–Papua New Guinea relations
- Australian regional rivalries
- List of regions in Australia
- New Australia
- Pacific Union
- Proposed provinces and territories of Canada
- Secessionism in Western Australia
- Secession in Australia
