= Historical reenactment in Australia =

Historical re-enactment in Australia has been occurring since at least the early 1970s. With no conventional land battles and few protracted civil disturbances since the British colonisation of Australia, most military re-enactment in Australia focuses on events from other countries (mostly European), including the European Feudal, medieval, and renaissance eras.

The Dark Ages, medieval, and Renaissance periods are popular eras for re-enactments, and the three largest events, as measured by participants, focus on these eras of history. 18th and 19th century re-enactment groups are also popular, and convey Australian interest in early colonial pre-federation military regiments. The history of the Australian Light Horse regiments are the area of Australian history with wide interest, with nearly 15 groups, the first starting in 1978 formed to reenact this period of military history. There is also some focus on the Australian Pioneer era.

== Groups ==
The oldest surviving re-enactment groups in Australia are the Ancient and Medieval Martial Arts Society, originally established in 1971. The Knights Guild of Wessex and Mercia Inc was formed in Queensland in 1979. Other early groups that no longer exist were the Melbourne Vikings, founded in the early 1970s, the Medieval Society of Tasmania. While focused more on living history rather than re-enactment, the Society for Creative Anachronism was formed as a local group in Sydney in 1980, before officially joining the US-based group in late 1981.

Two main umbrella groups represent the interests of re-enactment and living history groups around Australia: the Queensland Living History Federation(QLHF); and the Australian Re-enactors Association (ARA).

== Periods ==
=== Classical ===
Several groups and individuals reenact the classical period, with an emphasis on Greece and Republican Rome. Local and state groups include: Ancient Roman Reenactors Victoria, the Sydney Ancients Hoplite and Roman Society, Pax Romana (Qld), and Mare Nostrvm (Qld).

In 2020, a national association formed as a subsidiary and local chapter of Nova Roma in Oceania, called Australia Nova Romana. Like its parent organisation, this group offers a broad community with a focus on ancient Roman living history and education, with emphases on the use of Latin, study of Roman politics and practice of the cultus deorum romanum, the Roman religion.

=== Early medieval period ===
Many groups focus on the Viking, late Roman, and Early Byzantine eras. The New England Medieval Arts Society (NEMAS) Easter Festival focuses on this era, and 25 or so living history groups that specialise in this era attend this event. Groups include Scholai located in Melbourne and one of the best "fighting" forces of the Byzantine Empire, Ironguard Medieval Society located in Central West NSW, the Blue Mountains NSW and Illawarra NSW. One of the older and most established groups Europa at Springwood NSW who focus on the Viking occupation of York. Queensland groups portraying this period include, Staraya Ladoga, Saga Vikings Inc. In the ACT, the Dark Ages re-enactment group, Ancient Arts Fellowship (AAF) focuses on Viking, Norman, and Anglo Saxon portrayal.

This is a popular area of focus for the Kingdom of Lochac, a subgroup of the Society for Creative Anachronism in Australia.

=== Medieval ===
The Society for Creative Anachronism was probably the largest group to focus on this period, however in recent years metal-edged groups have become increasingly popular and rival SCA numbers today. Other groups include Company of the Staple, The Knights Order of Lion Rampant (Qld), Company of the Wolf, Condottieri (Qld), the Company of the Phoenix (Qld), Medieval Combat & Culture (MCC). Based in Southern Highlands and Central West NSW, Black Company (NSW), the Enterprise of the Black Garter and Oltramar (Qld).Two multi era groups are The Fyrd Inc (VIC) and Order of the Horse(QLD). Order of the Horse one of the largest multi era historical cavalry groups that covers 12thc 2nd,3rd Crusades Saracen and the 2nd to the 6thc Crusades up to early 13thc, the late 14thc cavalry and joust. The Order of the Horse is the first to create a complete Saracen mounted combat cavalry under Sultan Salah-ad-Din late 12thc Sultan. The Knights Guild of Wessex and Mercia researches daily life in 12th century England and are located in South East Queensland.

=== Renaissance – Early Modern ===
While less numerous, there are a number of groups that focus on this period. The largest is the Pike and Musket Society (also known as the Routiers) and the New England Colonial Living History Group. There are a number of schools that teach historical fencing techniques from this era, including the Stoccata school of Defence and Prima Spada School of Fence (Qld). Other groups in this period include Das Törichte Leben (Qld), and Historia Germanica (Qld).

=== 19th century ===
A number of groups focus on the activity of early colonial units. Sometimes these groups are based around a particular feature, like an historical fort. Other times, they focus on the history of an actual unit from the area. An example is New England Colonial Living History Group, located in Armidale, NSW There is some interest in American Civil War re-enactment, perhaps as a result of Australia's role in the conflict. Groups in Queensland focusing on this period include: 19th Century Queensland, The Queensland Colonial Association, and the Victoria Barracks Historical Society. Order of the Horse (QLD) also focuses on Napoleonic cavalry specialising in heavy cavalry. Order of the Horse founder of the group was the first to create the French 3eme,4eme Dragoon cavalry, 3e French Cuirassiers and the Brunswick Hussars unit in Australia.

Gympie, Queensland is home to the Gympie Historical Re-enactment Association which recreates the days of the Bush Rangers and the gold rush.

=== 20th century ===
Many groups focus on later periods, still within living memory – World War I, World War II and the Vietnam War. While there may be some opposition to groups with such a focus, many individuals have connections to this period through family and friends who served. There are a number of groups who portray this era in Queensland including, Army Group South, Contact Front – Vietnam War Living History Australia, Cobbers in Khaki and Green, and The Standard Bearers - Although most of these groups are now defunct.

=== Australian Light Horse ===
The focus on Australian Light Horse in Australia is quite large, considering that most participants must provide their own horse. There are many Australian groups that participate in light horse re-enactment. Unusual for Living history groups, the Light Horse groups participate in war memorial services. It was up until only recently that actual veterans from the campaigns still rode in memorial services, and the Light Horse re-enactors often have connections with their local Returned Services League. Groups normally reenact the units that were historically active in their areas. The oldest historical re-enactment group in Australia is "A Troop – Richmond/Windsor", started in 1978.

=== Historical European Martial Arts in Australia ===
See full article Historical European Martial Arts in Australia

While HEMA is not historical reenactment per se, as largely it focuses on the study of historical combat, while using modern clothing and equipment, there is some crossover activity with the extra study of historical context. Additionally, some HEMA practitioners study armoured combat, and some experiment with the practice of HEMA wearing period style clothing.

== Events ==
A number of smaller feasts, drill practices, weekend events, and tournaments are held throughout the year. These typically focus on the period dealt with by the group. Some historical groups are involved in ceremonial duties and teaching history. The Light Horse living history group and many 20th Century groups have associations with the Returned Services League (RSL) and are usually involved in ANZAC day duties. There has been a re-enactment of the Castle Hill convict rebellion (also known as the Battle of Vinegar Hill) and the Eureka Stockade, two historical battles of significance on Australian soil. The Australian Medieval Conference is a large biennial event focusing on arts, culture, and combat of this period.

There are several large living history events held regularly:

=== NECLHG Winter Solstice 18th Century Masquerade Party ===
This event is hosted every mid-winter by the New England Colonial Living History Group in Wychwood Forest near Armidale, New England New South Wales.

=== NEMAS Easter Gathering – Armidale ===
This event is a large Dark Age biennial Easter Gathering in Armidale in northern New South Wales. This is a combination of re-enactment groups from various parts of the world namely Australia and New Zealand, held every second Easter in The Armidale Pine Forest. It is attended by around 500 people, with numbers growing every year.

=== Rowany Festival ===
The Society for Creative Anachronism has held the Rowany Festival annually since April 1983, and is the longest running medieval/living history event in Australia. About 1,200 re-enactors usually attend, the largest number of Society members at any one event in Australia. SCA Heavy Combat activities at Rowany Festival have had more than 300 participants.

=== Medieval Conference ===
The Medieval Conference is a four-day event which has been held biennially since 1983. The first conference was held in the mid-1970s in a back yard, with the second hosted at the Macquarie University playing fields (now the M2 Toll Plaza) in October 1983. Participants sought to recreate the life and times of a number of specific periods of history from the ancient period to around 1650 AD. There were many activities, including lectures and workshops on historical and cultural topics, arts and crafts, feasts, games, and combat. It was an opportunity for all re-enactment groups to showcase what they do and to share their knowledge.

There was no conference held in 2015, a committee has been formed to hold the 2017 conference at a private property near Goulburn, NSW.

=== Abbey Tournament ===
Held at the Abbey Museum of Art and Archaeology in Caboolture, the Abbey Medieval Festival is a large festival held to educate the public and fund the Museum. It includes over 30 medieval re-enactment groups covering the period from 600 to 1600 AD in Europe and the Middle East. It features combat, music, dance, craft, and two large medieval banquets. It is the largest living history event by attendance, attracting over 37,000 spectators in 2012.

=== History Alive: A Journey Through Time ===
History Alive: A Journey Through Time is a multi-period re-enactment event with living history groups representing periods from the Roman era to the Vietnam War era. The event is run by the Queensland Living History Federation and aims to showcase many different periods of re-enactment. The event offers visitors a great day out with a historical focus.

It is held annually over the June weekend which has the second Monday, which was historically the Queens Birthday public holiday.

Until 2018, the annual event was held at Fort Lytton National Park in Lytton, Queensland - ongoing parking problems let to a change of venue and in 2019 Rocklea Showgrounds will be trialled as the venue.

=== St Ives Medieval Faire ===
Held annually on the 23rd and 24 September, the St Ives Medieval Faire hosts the international jousting championships. The faire has been running since 2013, except in 2020 and 2021. It features reenactors from the dark ages to the 17th century. The Faire hosts many well known re-enactment societies, including Order of the Horse (OOTH), Europa as well as the Pike and Musket society.

== See also ==
- Living history
- Society of Creative Anachronism, Australia
- Historical European Martial Arts in Australia
