= Historical European Martial Arts in Australia =

Martial Arts in Australia

The practice of Historical European Martial Arts (HEMA) first started in Australia in the late 19th century before largely dying out. There was then a revival of interest in the late 20th century to the current day. The practice of HEMA in Australia has grown to be a popular activity, with clubs all in capital cities, and the larger cities in Australia, Sydney and Melbourne, each have a number of clubs teaching various styles.

== History ==
=== European Martial Arts around turn of the century Australia ===
Unusually, Australia was the scene for relatively well attended broadsword competitions, in the late 19th century. Some of the first practice of HEMA in Australia occurred when an English champion of the broadsword, Captain Duncan Ross, fought another British military instructor, Captain Jennings in San Francisco. Though Ross won the tournament, Jennings left the United States, to travel to Australia. Jennings then fought a mounted sword competition with a local challenger, "Sergeant J. R. Donovan., late Drill Instructor to 4th Royal Irish Dragoon Guards, Champion Swordsman of Australia.". Hearing of this, Ross took the first boat to Australia, and challenged Jennings to a tournament, to confirm his title. The initial tournament, in December 1889, saw Ross break his sword and the tournament was postponed. The follow-up tournament was attended by 5600 people. The final tournament was attended by 25,000 people, with Jennings defeating Ross, an early large interest in Australian Hema (from a spectators point of view, at least0. However, Jennings himself was then defeated by an Australian, Sergeant J. R. Donovan. Donovan eventually lost the title to a Professor Parker, who was the last person to hold the title, remaining unchallenged till his death in Sydney, in April, 1916.

Some HEMA in Australia had been practiced, in the later part of the early 20th century, mainly in the context of the Australian Military. The Australian defence forces practiced sword drills, and some competitions and mounted sword combat. Additionally, the military sometimes would run "Assault at Arms exhibitions". HEMA in Australia was featured by soldiers performing feats of arms, often for charity, including in at least one case, Bartitsu

=== Late 20th century revival ===
Probably the earliest HEMA activity in Australia was that of Stephen Hand, Andrew Brew and Peter Radvan who started researching rapier and sword from period manuals in the mid 80s and teaching in around 1990. At this time, most European style combat in Australia was in the context of Historical reenactment in Australia. With few primary sources available, it was largely improvised with little relationship to authentic historical practice. All three men were involved in Re-enactment groups but wanted to move more into the actual study of period combat techniques.

Stephen Hand originally from Hobart, moved to Sydney, where Brew and Radvan lived in 1989, and together they taught themselves and researched historical fencing from the few resources they had available. When they discovered the American scholar Patri Pugliese who collected, copied and sold historical fencing manuals, they gained access to more material but continued teaching as part of several historical reenactment groups. They started the Stoccata School of Defence, Gordon, Sydney in August 1998, which was one of the first groups in Australia to approach HEMA as a traditional art of defence in itself, rather than in the context of re-enacting a period or era. One of the early stars of Stoccata was Paul Wagner who rapidly rose to become a fourth instructor. Stephen and Paul have gone on to teach HEMA all over the world and to write a number of highly regarded books on various HEMA systems.

At around the same time Julian Clark, a modern fencing instructor was exploring historical fencing in Canberra and founded the Finesse Academy of Fencing.

A few other clubs started to form around this time, with Scott McDonald forming the Australian College of Arms (ACA) in Brisbane and then restarting it in Melbourne when he moved there. In 1995 a group of mostly Italian and German competitive fencers from Penrith Fencing Academy and Double Eagle at the German Austrian Club (Winter, Sanders, Ketibian, et al.) introduced training and formal competition in rapier and broadsword forming an unnamed group that endured until 2005 when it merged with the Sydney chapter of the Masonic Academy of Arms. Their use of historical weapons was done with modern electric fencing gear and led to some technical advances in modernizing medieval weapons to be electric by a swordsmith and historian in their academy leading to the first electric period weapons, including spears and axes.

In September 1999 Scott McDonald organised one of the first open group events for historical fencing in Australia, named the first Historical Fencing Meeting (later to be called Historical Fencing Conferences) in Brisbane. At around the same time in Brisbane fencers who were part of the Historical Armed Combat Association (HACA) broke away to form their own fencing organisations. Notable among these was Bill Carew, who formed Collegium in Armis, which continues to operate to this day.

Historical Fencing Conferences were held yearly from 1999. International guests were invited to teach at these conferences, including Bob Charron, Ramon and Jeannette Martinez, Tom Leoni, and Milo Thurston. In 2000, the idea of an association for historical fencing groups was raised. This became the Australian Historical Swordplay Federation, and formally started in 2002, with Stephen Hand as the first President.

In Melbourne, after Scott McDonald moved to Brisbane, the Melbourne Swordplay Guild was formed (in 2003)from those old members of the Australian College of Arms that wanted to continue. Initially the group used the Stoccata syllabus of George Silver. Members of the Melbourne Swordplay Guild went on to form numerous clubs in Melbourne, Die Fechtschule in 2005, GLECA (Glen Lachlann Estate College of Arms), Fechtschule Victoria in 2013, Scholar Victoria in 2017, and most recently BAA (Barwon Academy of Arms) in 2020.

By 2004, Stoccata in Sydney had grown and had spawned a Tasmanian group, to become Australia's first interstate club. Stoccata now have ten branches Australia wide.

Over the years seminars have benefited from visiting overseas experts in HEMA, including visits to Sydney and Melbourne by Arne Koets, Guy Windsor (an expert in Italian Swordsmanship) Puck Curtis and most recently, Ingulf Kohlweiss, chief trainer of INDES Salzburg (Austria) and Peter Smallridge from the UK.

Some Rapier has developed within the Australian branch of the Society for Creative Anachronism, the Kingdom of Lochac, with some SCA members learning SCA fencing (which has become more based on period practice over time) and some SCA fencers in Melbourne starting separate schools of Historical swordsmanship distinct from the SCA.

By 2017, the interest in HEMA had grown to the point where there were clubs in most large cities in Australia

Some equipment, mainly for HEMA Longsword is designed in Australia, with synthetic swords and protective gauntlets made by WMA shop in Sydney, and Gambesons for Longsword designed in Melbourne by AESIR.

== National bodies and associations ==
The Australian Historical Swordplay Federation formed in 2002, and was the first group in Australia with the aim of being an umbrella group for groups practicing HEMA. The Federation was initially formed with 5 groups, Stoccata, ACA, Finesse, Gemeiner Academy and Prima Spada. This association ran for a number of years, conducted research and ran annual conferences. The Federation also hosted an annual conference and fought the anti-sword legislation in the Australian states of Victoria and NSW, helping to stop the banning of Swords in the latter state. Stephen Hand was the inaugural President, with the Presidency eventually going to Scott Nimmo in Melbourne. However support and interest in the Federation petered out, and the Federation was wound up in 2014.

With the activity of the Australian Historical Swordplay Federation winding down, another group was formed by Scott Nimmo in Melbourne. Like the Federation, this group's aim was to act as an umbrella group for HEMA clubs active in Australia. This was the Western Martial Academies of Australia (WMAA). The WMAA has 10 groups as either members or affiliates, and liaises with groups over issues including syllabi, members and safety, and has organised over 50 tournaments.

In 2018 the Historical Fencing Association (HFA) another umbrella organisation, was formed by Jerry Gullotti along with fencers from Queensland, Melbourne, Adelaide, Perth, and Sydney. This group was formed to focus more heavily on the sporting aspects of HEMA, to provide a unified insurance system for member clubs, and assist clubs with standards for safety, rules, and starting new clubs. At the close of 2019 HFA had 17 member/affiliate groups.

== Styles of combat ==
Within HEMA in Australia, there is a wide variety of weapons and martial styles practiced. The 20 or so clubs in Australia have a wide area of focus and practice, using various particular weapons and practicing various styles. Some focus on one weapon and the use of it, while others will focus on a number of weapons in the same period, and others will focus on different periods. Early clubs in Australia focused primarily on rapier, sidesword and backsword, largely because of the interest of the practitioners, and the limited availability of English language or translated manuals at the time. Later clubs focused on Longsword, with some clubs focusing on the German school of fencing while others focused on the Italian school of swordsmanship. In recent times, there has also been a focus on Victorian era martial arts within HEMA in Australia, including Savate, Canne de combat, Sabre, Bartitsu and Boxing.

== Tournaments and conferences ==
=== The Historical Swordplay Convention ===
The annual Australian Historical Swordplay Convention, primarily a teaching event, was hosted and attended by diverse Australian groups from 1999 to 2006. It was held initially in Brisbane in 1999 and then 2006, Sydney in 2000 and 2004, Canberra in 2001 and 2005, the Gold Coast in 2003 and Melbourne in 2002.

=== Swordplay ===
In 2009 Scott McDonald started what was to become one of the largest and longest running Historical European Martial Arts events, Swordplay. Swordplay initially started with all the groups in Brisbane competing, under a group of rules devised to be acceptable as much as possible, for all participants. The event is the longest running tournament of its kind in Australia, still running in 2024. At times Swordplay has been referred to as the National tournament for HEMA, but the organisers themselves and many participants acknowledge there are now in fact a number of tournaments, and there currently is no official recognised “national” event.

=== Swordfight ===
In May 2015, Sword Fight Gold Coast was run. Building of the Swordplay and Nordic models, Sword Fight was developed to provide a professional indoor event for Queensland historical fencers. Additionally, Sword Fight provided access to novice divisions using synthetic weapons in order to provide an inclusive environment for rookie fencers. In 2016 this event became the first tournament in Australia to include a women's division.

In 2015 Australia's Stoccata School of Defence hosted a revival of the World Broadsword Championship in Sydney, Australia. This event, held throughout the late 19th century in England, the United States and Australia was last won by Professor Parker in Sydney in 1891. Parker was never challenged. The 2015 event was won by Paul Wagner of Sydney, also the current holder of the Glorianna Cup, the broadsword championship of Britain. Lewis Hand of Hobart, Australia won the junior title. In the tradition of the 19th century title, the championship is held in the home town of the current Champion. As such the championship was held again in Sydney in September 2017 with Paul Wagner once again claiming victory. In June 2018 the championship was held at the Australian Western Martial Arts Convention (AWMAC) in Sydney. It was won by Mark Holgate of the Adelaide Sword Academy who will host the next championship in Adelaide in 2019. AWMAC was hosted by Stoccata in Sydney Australia in June 2016. It built off a similar event run in Wellington, New Zealand in October 2015, and it was originally planned to hold this event on different sides of the Tasman Sea in alternate years. That hasn't proved successful and hence AWMAC will become an annual event, with the next one scheduled for June 2019.

Fechtschule Victoria ran their inaugural Festival Of The Sword in 2016, a large tournament and seminar with international guests, in Melbourne Australia.This tournament ran until 2020, when it was cancelled because of the covid epidemic.

Scholar Victoria ran their first Oktoberfecht Charity Tournament in 2018, a Meyer-centric competition in Dusack, Sidesword, and Longsword, with all profits going to local charities.

In Western Australia, War in the West has been hosted by House Darksun since 2015, and will be hosted by Ursa Major HEMA Academy from 2019.

In Tasmania the Tasmanian Swordplay Symposium, a teaching and tournament event was held in early December 2017 and is planned to be an annual event.

== Australian League Circuit for HEMA ==
Australia has an official league circuit, the Australian Historical Fencing League (http://www.aushistoricalfencing.org/). Established in 2016 by a HEMA practitioner, Alexander Roberson, it allocates points for placement in recognised tournaments. The tournaments are held in the various states of Australia, and are divided into two tiers. With this, a leaderboard has been established to indicate where participating HEMA practitioners are placed. It fulfills a few roles for HEMA Australia practitioners by encouraging participation in tournaments and their associated conferences, supporting participating conferences/tournaments by highlighting their existence, encouraging people to travel to different tournaments, and also to build the HEMA community in Australia. State representatives are nominated, and then voted on to the committee by those in the hema community from their respective state, on a yearly basis. The first election was held December 2016, with reps from 6 states voted on to the committee.

== See also ==
- Historical European Martial Arts
- Historical reenactment in Australia

== Australian Schools specialising in individual prominent historical masters of defence ==
=== Achille Marozzo ===
- Stoccata School of Defence
- Spada di Bolognese
- Sword Fighter

=== Alfred Hutton ===
- The Old Sword Club
- Scholar Victoria

=== Antonio Manciolino ===
- Stoccata School of Defence
- Spada di Bolognese

=== Camillo Agrippa ===
- LongEdge Fencing

=== Diogo Gomes de Figueyredo ===
- Brisbane School of Iberian Swordsmanship

=== Domingo Luis Godinho ===
- Brisbane School of Iberian Swordsmanship
- LongEdge Fencing

=== Fiore dei Liberi ===
- Brisbane Swords
- Melbourne Sword Guild
- By the Sword Ballarat
- The School of Historical Fencing
- Stoccata School of Defence

=== Francois Dancie ===
- LongEdge Fencing

=== George Silver (English 16th century) ===
- School of Historical Defense Arts
- Stoccata School of Defence

=== Giovanni Dall'Agocchie ===
- Spada di Bolognese

=== Girolamo (Hieronyme) Cavalcabo ===
- LongEdge Fencing

=== Giuseppe Radaelli ===
- Victorian Historical Combat Academy
- Stoccata School of Defence

=== Henry de Sainct-Didier ===
- LongEdge Fencing

=== Jeronimo de Carranza (La Verdadera Destreza) ===
- Brisbane School of Iberian Swordsmanship

=== Joachim Meyer ===
- Scholar Victoria
- Stoccata School of Defence
- Sword Fighter

=== Johannes Lecküchner ===
- Melbourne Messer Club

=== Johannes Liechtenauer ===
- Collegium in Armis
- Fecthschule Victoria
- Sword Fighter Gold Coast
- Die Schlachtschule Canberra
- Ursa Major HEMA Academy
- House Darksun
- Scholar Victoria
- Stoccata School of Defence

=== John Musgrave Waite ===
- The Old Sword Club

=== Joseph Swetnam ===
- Stoccata School of Defence

=== Luis Pacheco de Narváez ===
- Brisbane School of Iberian Swordsmanship

=== MS I.33 ===
- Stoccata School of Defence
- Sword Fighter Gold Coast

=== Pedro de Heredia ===
- LongEdge Fencing

=== Ridolfo Capo Ferro ===
- Stoccata School of Defence

=== Salvator Fabris ===
- Sword Fighter Gold Coast

=== Sigmund Ringeck ===
- Scholar Victoria

=== Vincentio Saviolo ===
- School of Historical Defense Arts
- Stoccata School of Defence

== See also ==
- List of martial arts
