= Yidinji =

Yidinji or Yidindji may refer to:

- Yidinji people
- Sovereign Yidindji Government
- Yidiny language
