= Aboriginal passport =

Travel document issued unofficially in Australia

An Aboriginal passport is a travel document issued by various Indigenous Australian groups (such as the Aboriginal Provisional Government (APG) and the Indigenous Social Justice Association) as an assertion of Indigenous sovereignty and a rejection of the authority of the Australian state. Such documents are not recognized as valid by the Australian government or its Australian Customs and Border Protection Service, although some people have been permitted to re-enter Australia using such documents. The documents are recognised as "fantasy passports" by the European Union.

== Use by activists ==
In the late 1980s Tasmanian activist Michael Mansell introduced an Aboriginal Passport. The passport was issued to a delegation that visited Libya in 1988. The passports were used to get into Libya and Mansell in an interview said that it was the "first time I've had any other country recognise the fact that I'm not Australian". On the delegation's return to Australia they were detained by immigration officials until they produced Australian documentation. The Aboriginal Provisional Government, an organization seeking to create an Aboriginal nation, continued to issue Aboriginal Passports into the 1990s. The group regards the Australian passport issued by the Australian government as "a foreign and colonial travel document" and so issues Aboriginal passports as "an act of Aboriginal sovereignty."

Under Australia's Migration Act 1958 everyone entering the country must have a legal travel document, which under the act is termed as a passport. Barbara Hocking claims that under Australian law a passport is deemed to be a document which looks like a passport. Hocking asserts that since the APG issues Aboriginal passports that look like passports Hocking claims that customs agents cannot refuse entry while using Aboriginal passports because under the terms of Australian law they have a travel document issued by the APG that looks like a passport.

In September 2012, the Indigenous Social Justice Association, an Australian group which wants recognition of Aboriginal sovereignty, showed their support for WikiLeaks founder Julian Assange by giving him an Aboriginal Nations passport.

In September 2014, four Indigenous Australian activists were permitted to re-enter Australia from Canada using "Aboriginal Provisional Government" passports but were warned not to attempt it again.

== See also ==
- Haudenosaunee passport
- Songline
