= Jeremy Geia =

Saint Murrumu of Walubara

Foreign Affairs Minister of the Sovereign Yidindji Government
- Incumbent
- Assumed office 2014
- Chief Minister: Gudju-Gudju Gimuybara

Trade Minister of the Sovereign Yidindji Government
- Incumbent
- Assumed office 2014
- Chief Minister: Gudju-Gudju Gimuybara
Ministerial positions
Communications & Broadband Minister of the Sovereign Yidindji Government
Incumbent
Assumed office unknown
Chief Minister	Gudju-Gudju Gimuybara
Financial Technology Minister of the Sovereign Yidindji Government
Incumbent
Assumed office unknown
Chief Minister	Gudju-Gudju Gimuybara
Renewable Energy Minister of the Sovereign Yidindji Government
Incumbent
Assumed office unknown
Chief Minister	Gudju-Gudju Gimuybara

Personal details
- Born: Jeremy Geia; 1974 (age 51–52) Cairns, Queensland, Australia
- Citizenship: Australian (until 2014)
- Occupation: Journalist, Activist

Murrumu Walubara Yidindji, Saint Murrumu of Walubara (born 1974), also known by his former western name Jeremy Geia, is a Yidindji former journalist and Australian Aboriginal activist. He is the foreign affairs minister of the Sovereign Yidindji Government micronation, having renounced his Australian citizenship in 2014.

== Early life ==
Geia was born in Cairns in 1974 to an Aboriginal mother and Croatian Jewish father. In 1999, he won the NAIDOC Youth of the Year award. In 2001 Geia, as self-appointed President, symbolically declared the "Peoples Democratic Republic of Palm Island" independent from Australia.

== Journalism career ==
Geia was an NITV and SBS journalist, who was part of the Canberra Press Gallery. In 2012 he became the first western journalist to obtain an interview with Julian Assange at the Ecuadorian embassy in London. He left his job when he renounced Australian citizenship.

== Sovereign Yidindji Government ==
Murrumu has served as the foreign affairs minister and the trade minister of the Sovereign Yidindji Government for about 10 years, he additionally serves in the portfolios of Communications & Broadband, Renewable Energy, and Financial Technology.

Murrumu was charged by police in May 2015 after being caught driving a car with a license and registration plates issued by the Yidindji government.
