= Haudenosaunee passport =

Passports issued to Haudenosaunee nationals

- Type: Passport
- Issued by: Haudenosaunee
- First issued: 1923
- Purpose: Identification
- Eligibility: Haudenosaunee nationality

The Haudenosaunee passport, also known as the Iroquois passport, is a passport issued by the Haudenosaunee Confederacy.

== History ==
The Haudenosaunee government has issued passports since at least 1923, when Haudenosaunee authorities issued a passport to Cayuga statesman Deskaheh to travel to the League of Nations headquarters in Geneva. The Haudenosaunee passport evolved from negotiations with the U.S. State Department, Canada, Britain and other countries and has been used since 1977.

In 2005 Japan allowed a delegation travelling on the Haudenosaunee passport to visit that country for the World Congress of the International Association for the History of Religions.

In July 2010 the United Kingdom did not accept the tribal passports of the Haudenosaunee Nationals field lacrosse team for travel to the UK for the 2010 World Lacrosse Championship. The United States government offered to immediately issue United States passports to the team-members, and several days after this offer was rejected, issued waivers that would allow the team back into the US; however, the UK continued to refuse to issue visas. In July 2018 Israel accepted the team's passports, subject to assurances from the Canadian government that they would be allowed back into Canada on them. In August 2022, Ireland acknowledged and accepted Haudenosaunee passports for the 2022 Under 21 World Lacrosse Championship.

== Validity ==
The validity of an Haudenosaunee passport for various purposes has been questioned, and the issue is entangled with the larger issue of Haudenosaunee sovereignty.

The Isle of Man has issued public warnings rejecting the document as a valid form of either identification or nationality and regards holders as US or Canadian citizens, and the European Union does not recognise it as a valid travel document and has issued guidelines stating that visas cannot be affixed to the passport, barring holders from the Schengen Area. Both list the Haudenosaunee passport as a "fantasy passport", a document issued by a minority, sect, population group or private organization, which according to the Isle of Man has "no authority and to which no official recognition has been given".

The governments in the United States, the United Kingdom and Canada have refused to endorse the document as valid document for international travel. Additionally, the document does not appear on the list of forms of acceptable identification to cross into Canada. The Haudenosaunee passport has, however, been successfully used for international travel.

As of 2010, the passports did not meet the 2009 Western Hemisphere Travel Initiative requirements for entry to the United States, although upgrades were in progress.

=== Canada ===
The Haudenosaunee passport is not accepted for entry into Canada. In early 2010, a delegation from Kahnawake to an environmental conference in Bolivia was unable to return to Canada on the passport, stranding the group in El Salvador for several weeks before they were allowed, under escort, to transit via the United States. On June 18, 2011, another incident occurred at the Cornwall, Ontario port-of-entry into Canada when an Akwesasne Mohawk woman's Haudenosaunee passport was confiscated and a Certificate of Indian Status card had to be used to cross the border. When asked about this incident, a spokesman for the Canada Border Services Agency confirmed that the passport is not on Canada's list of acceptable identification.

== Other Indigenous nations' passports ==
In 1977, a Cree man named Fred Plains from Timmins, Ontario, Canada, claimed to have successfully entered Sweden on a home-made Cree passport.

== See also ==
- Aboriginal passport
- Indigenous law
- Tribal sovereignty in the United States
