= Australia and the American Civil War =

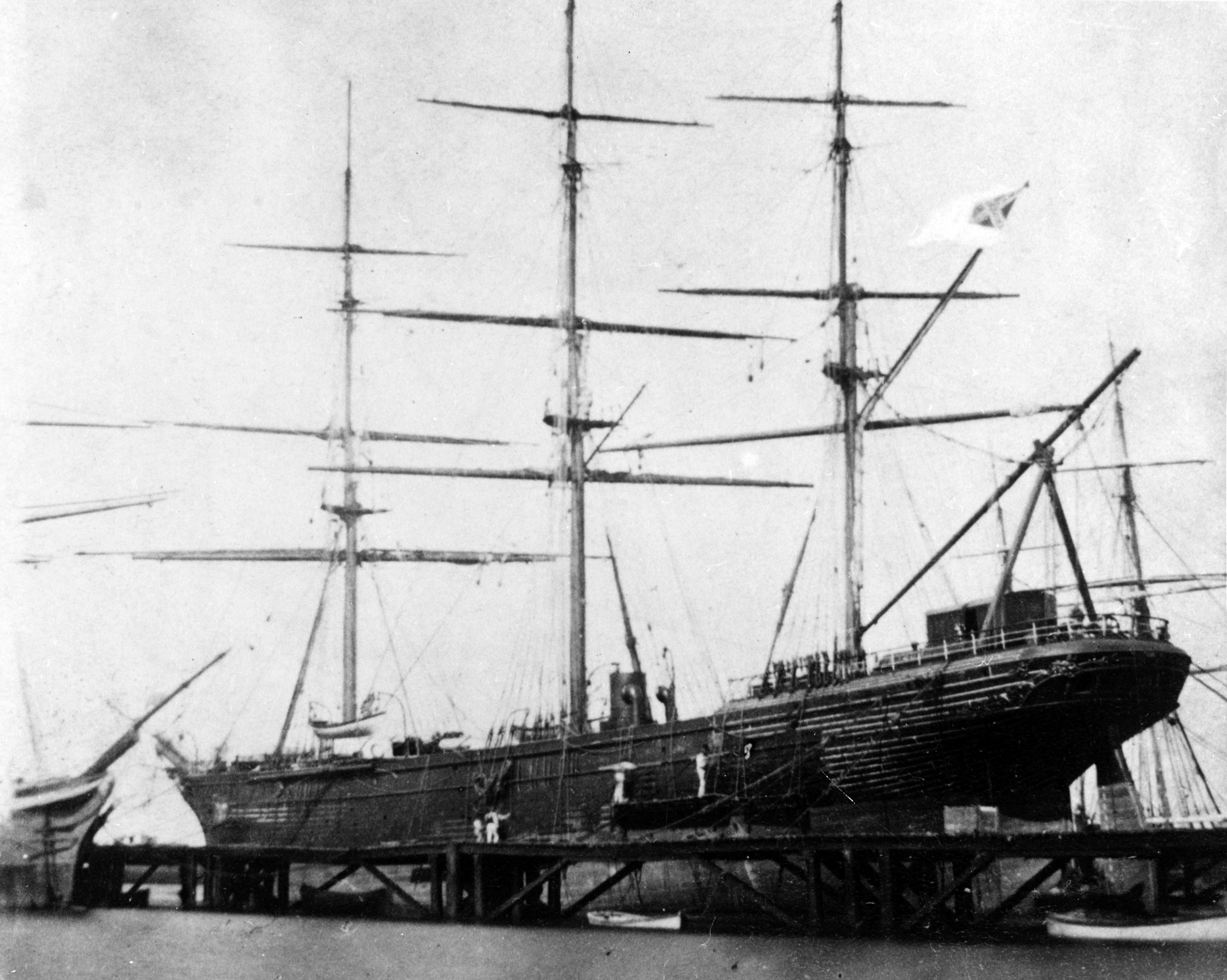
The CSS Shenandoah being repaired in Australia

Despite being across the world from the conflict, the Australian colonies were affected by the American Civil War both economically and by immigration. The Australian cotton crop became more important to Britain, which had lost its American sources, and Australia served as a supply base for Confederate blockade runners. Immigrants from Europe seeking a better life also found Australia preferable to war-torn North America.

The Australian public was shocked by the revelation by a Russian navy deserter, who claimed that attacks on British naval targets was secretly planned by Russia in the case of an outbreak of war with Britain. The Russian navy had just paid Australia a visit in preparation for launching attacks. Fear of a possible military confrontation led to a massive buildup of coastal defences and to the acquisition of an ironclad warship.

Australia became directly involved when the Confederate navy visited in order to repair one of their warships. This led to protests from the Union representative at Melbourne, while the citizenry of nearby Williamstown entertained the Confederates and some Australians joined the crew. Accounts disagree as to whether Australians generally favored the Union or the Confederacy.

== Economics ==
Together, 140 Australians and New Zealanders were veterans of the American Civil War, 100 of whom were native-born. Some of these were originally Americans who came to Australia during the Victorian gold rush of the 1850s. Officers during the war included one who gave Tasmania its first telegraph service, and another officer who mined for gold in Ballarat. Confederate blockade runners occasionally obtained supplies there, despite a historic fear of possible naval attack by Americans, a fear rooted in the actions of American privateers during the War of 1812.

The war also caused the Lancashire Cotton Famine. As a result, Queensland saw a rise in its cotton industry, while the National Colonial Emigration Society in Britain was founded, although it had little ongoing relevance. This came about as a result of so many individuals from northern England being affected by the inability of the Southern United States to ship cotton during the war. Once the war ended, little cotton from southern Australia was imported to England. Another impact was the competition with Canada that Australia and New Zealand had with Irish immigration. The increasing Irish immigration was seen as an economic boon by these countries. One of the reasons for the increase was due to many Irish deciding against emigrating to the warring nations of North America.

== Imperial Russian Navy ==
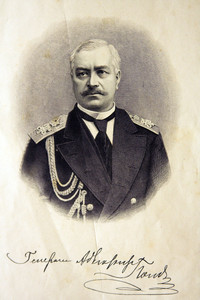
Russian Admiral Andrey Popov

During the American Civil War, Anglo-Russian relations were worsened by Russian perceptions that the British were covertly supporting the January Uprising against Russian rule in Poland. The Russian admiralty feared that the Russian navy could be blockaded by the British and French navies in the case of an outbreak of war, and thus dispatched several squadrons to North America, including San Francisco and from 1863 New York—with sealed orders to attack British naval targets in case war broke out between Russia and Britain. The flagship of the Russian Pacific squadron, Bogatyr under Rear Admiral Andrei Alexandrovich Popov, officially made a friendly visit to Melbourne in early 1863. According to information passed on to Australian authorities in June 1864, Popov had in the first half of the year 1863 received orders and a plan of attack on the British warships positioned near the Australian shore. The plan also included shelling and destruction of the Melbourne, Sydney and Hobart coastal batteries.

The information was attributed to Lieutenant Władysław Zbyszewski, a Russian navy officer from Poland stationed onboard Bogatyr, who had deserted from service in Shanghai soon after she left Australia, and found his way to Paris to join the January Uprising. This information about Popov's supposed plans was forwarded by a fellow Pole, S. Rakowsky. Similar attack orders are known to have been given to the Atlantic squadron under Rear Admiral Lessovsky, that was sent to New York at the same time.

== CSS Shenandoah ==
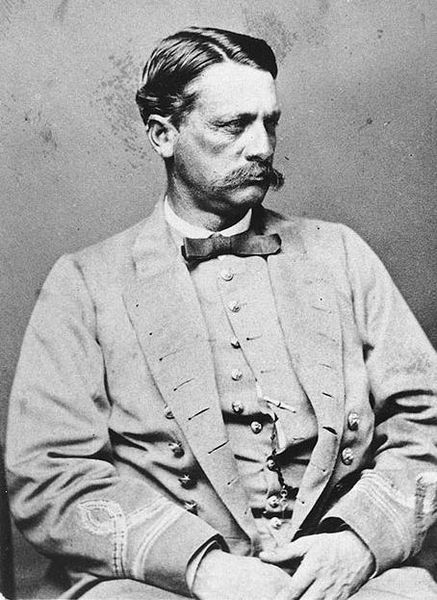
James Iredell Waddell

Having crossed the Indian Ocean, the CSS Shenandoah arrived in Australian waters on 17 January 1865. Off the coast of South Australia at 39°32′14″S 122°16′52″E, her crew spotted an American-made sailing ship named the Nimrod and boarded it. Having ascertained it was an English ship, the Shenandoah left it alone.

On 25 January 1865, the Shenandoah made harbor at Williamstown, Victoria, near Melbourne, in order to repair damage received while capturing Union whaling-ships. At seven o'clock in the evening, Waddell sent Lieutenant Grimball to gain approval from local authorities to repair their ship; Grimball returned three hours later saying they were granted permission. The United States consul, William Blanchard, insisted that the Victorian government arrest the Confederates as pirates, but Victoria's governor, Sir Charles Henry Darling, ignored his pleas, satisfied with the Shenandoah’s pleading of neutrality when requesting to be allowed to undertake repairs. Aside from a few fist fights between Americans, there was no direct conflict between the two warring sides in Melbourne. However, there were eighteen desertions while ashore, and there were constant threats of Northern sympathisers joining the crew in order to capture the ship when it was at sea.

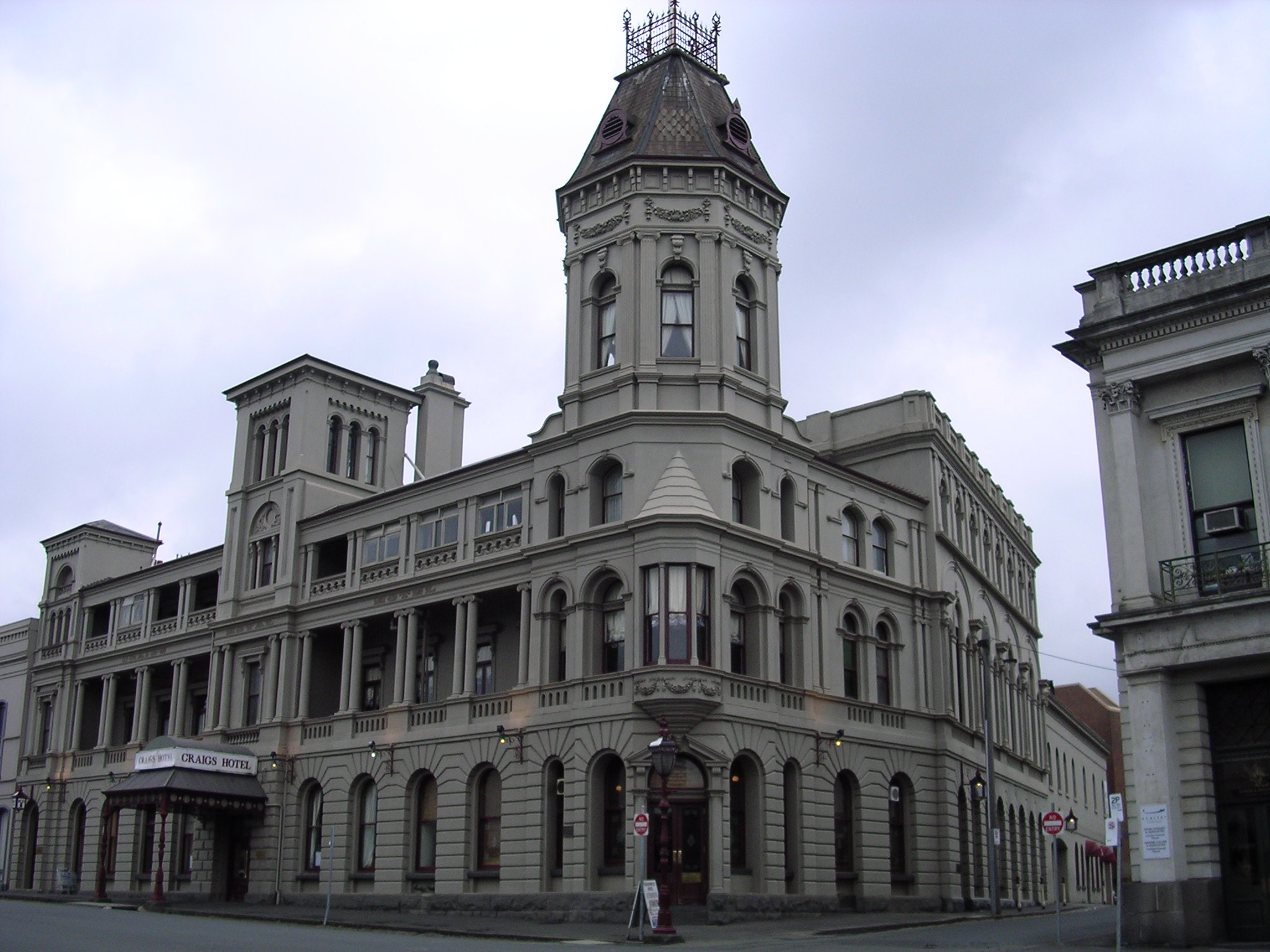
Craig's Royal Hotel

The local citizenry expressed great interest in the Confederate ship in Port Phillip Bay. While at Williamstown, James Iredell Waddell, the captain of the Shenandoah and his men participated in several "official functions" which the local citizens arranged in their honour, including a gala ball with the "cream of society" at Craig's Royal Hotel in Ballarat and at the Melbourne Club. Thousands of tourists came to see the ship every day, requiring special trains to accommodate them. After being treated as "little lions", the officers of the Shenandoah later reflected that the best time of their lives was given to them by the women of Melbourne.

After leaving Australia, the Shenandoah sailed north into the Pacific Ocean and captured twenty-five additional Union whaling ships before finally surrendering at Liverpool, England in November 1865. Those surrendering included 42 Australians who had joined the crew at Williamstown; sources differ as to whether the Australians were stowaways or illegally recruited. Waddell had refused Australian authorities permission to see if Australians were aboard the ship prior to sailing from Williamstown on 18 February 1865. Four Australians had been arrested by police to prevent them from joining the Confederate ship, and Governor Darling allowed the Shenandoah to sail away, instead of firing upon it. Waddell's official report said that on 18 February they "found on board" the 42 men, and made 36 sailors and enlisted six as marines. One of the original Confederate crewmen, midshipman John Thomson Mason, stated that they just happened to find the stowaways, of various nationalities, and enlisted them outside of Australian waters. He further said one of the stowaways was the captain of an English steamer that was at Melbourne at the time; the Englishman became the captain's clerk.

== Aftermath ==
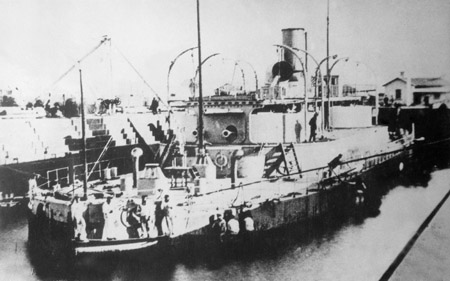
HMVS Cerberus

The residents of Melbourne, realizing they were vulnerable to attack by others, especially the Russians due to the events during the war, hurried to build coastal defense forts. This included the government of Victoria requesting an ironclad ship to be sent to protect the colony after the value of ironclads were demonstrated during the American Civil War's Battle of Hampton Roads. The monitor HMVS Cerberus was constructed during the late 1860s and arrived in Victoria in 1871.

In 1872 the British government paid the United States US$3,875,000 as a result of the assistance provided to CSS Shenandoah and other Confederate ships in Victoria and other ports controlled by Great Britain, after an international jury ruled on the case in Geneva, Switzerland.

=== Self-government ===
When the six colonies of the Australian continent federated to form a self-governing nation in 1901, Australia favored the British model of government as they had misgivings about America's powerful postwar "monarchical" presidency. Australians also opposed the importation of "coloured labour" and established the White Australia policy, in part due to fears of a similar civil war breaking out in Australia. A further precautionary measure was evident in the addition of the word "indissoluble" to the Federal Constitution of 1897–1898 in Adelaide, to prevent the "political heresy" of secession as engaged in by the Confederacy.

== See also ==
- History of Australia (1851–1900)
