= Secession in Australia =

Related political movements

Western Australia

Tasmania

This article relates to historical and current separatist movements within Australia. Separatism conventionally refers to full political separation, including secessionism; groups simply seeking greater autonomy are not separatist as such.

== List of movements ==
=== Western Australia ===
Various attempts for secession have occurred in Western Australia, including the 1933 Western Australian secession referendum, and a number of more recent movements have continued proposing and pushing for independence, including the Western Australia Secessionist Movement

=== Tasmania ===
Tasmania, historically an independent colony which joined the Commonwealth of Australia which has had various support groups that have proposed secessionism in Tasmania, with Labor Premier Doug Lowe and Liberal Premier Robin Gray seriously considered secession. In the 1990s the First Party of Tasmania was formed, which aimed for Tasmanian secession.

=== Racial ===
==== Indigenous Australians ====
Various proposals have been created to grant Indigenous Australians their own ethnostate, and have also proposed additional autonomous for aboriginal groups that hold native title land over various areas of Australia. The Aboriginal Tent Embassy has demanded that the government give Aboriginals control of the Northern Territory as a state, mining rights to all aboriginal reserve lands and settlements, compensation money for lands not returnable to take the form of a down-payment of A$6 Billion and an annual percentage of the gross national income.

==== Murrawarri Republic ====
Murrawarri Republic is a micronation in Australia created by an ethnic/racial Indigenous group that has been pushing for independence of Indigenous Australians.

==== Euahlayi Peoples Republic ====
The Euahlayi Peoples Republic is an Aboriginal micronation that declared independence from Australia in 2013.

==== Republic of Mbarbaram ====
The Republic of Mbarbaram is an Aboriginal micronation that declared independence from Australia in 2013.

==== Wiradjuri Central West Republic ====
The Wiradjuri Central West Republic is an Aboriginal micronation that declared independence from Australia in 2014.

==== Sovereign Yidinji government ====
The Sovereign Yidinji government is an Aboriginal micronation that declared independence from Australia in 2014.
