= Chapter VI of the Constitution of Australia =

Process for admitting new states

Chapter VI of the Constitution of Australia pertains to the admission of new states, alteration of the limits of existing states, and the governance of the territories. Since Federation, no new states have been admitted, although several territories have been admitted to the Commonwealth.

There are four sections within this chapter, they are:

- Section 121: New States may be admitted or established
- Section 122: Government of territories
- Section 123: Alteration of limits of States
- Section 124: Formation of new States: constitutional provision for creating new Australian States.

== See also ==
- Proposals for new Australian states
