= Princeland =

Coordinates: 38°03′23″S 140°57′57″E

Princeland was a proposed colony of Australia that would have been formed by the western part of Victoria and the south-eastern part of South Australia. The movement began the early 1860s and resulted in a petition to Queen Victoria, which was ultimately rejected on the grounds that it would involve changes to two separate colonies and could not be done without their expressed permissions.

Edward Henty led The West Victorian Separation League, which aimed to establish the new colony, whose proposed capital was to be Mount Gambier and its main port Portland. The new colony was named after Queen Victoria's consort, Prince Albert and was to comprise the area bounded on the east by Longitude 143° (approximately the longitude of Ararat), on the west and north by the Murray River, and south to the coast. The proposed territory would have included most of the Western District, Wimmera and Mallee, as well as the Limestone Coast and Riverland in South Australia. The League collected 1,500 signatures on a petition, which was sent to Secretary of State, Duke of Newcastle, who then passed it on to Queen Victoria. The petition was rejected as the permission of both the colonies of South Australia and Victoria would have been needed for the new colony to come about, and neither were willing to accept the proposal.

== See also ==
- Proposals for new Australian States
