= Australian Indigenous sovereignty =

Concept and political movement in Australia

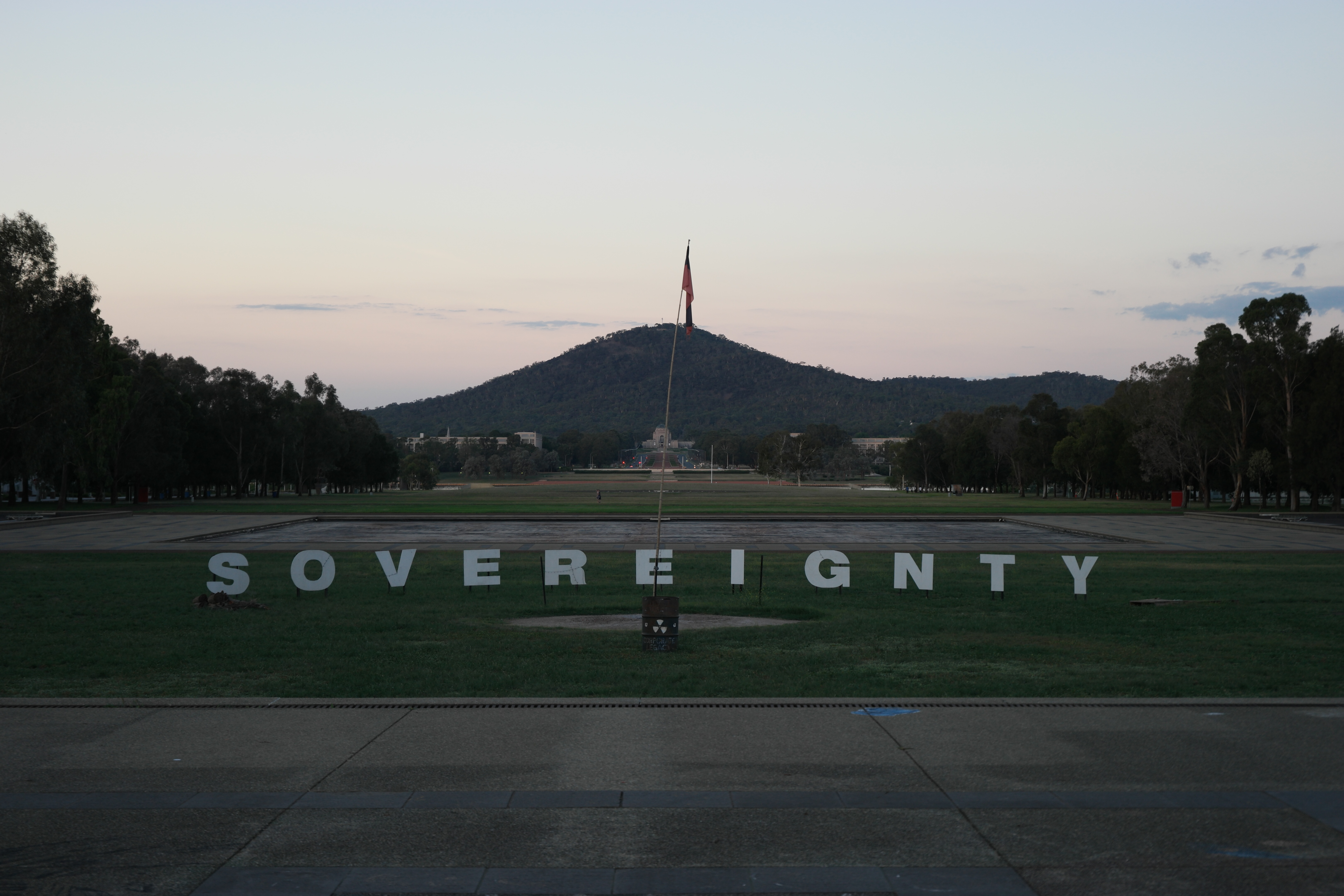
Sovereignty sign at the Aboriginal Tent Embassy

Australian Indigenous sovereignty, also recently termed Blak sovereignty, encompasses the various rights claimed by Aboriginal and Torres Strait Islander peoples within Australia. Such rights are said to derive from Indigenous peoples' occupation and ownership of Australia prior to colonisation and through their continuing spiritual connection to land. Indigenous sovereignty is not recognised in the Australian Constitution or under Australian law.

Political movements emerged in the 20th and 21st centuries around the cause of Indigenous sovereignty, seeking various political, economic and cultural rights both within and outside the Australian state. These have included land rights, the right for Indigenous peoples to be treated as a distinct polity with their own laws and institutions, and various cultural and intellectual property rights. These rights are not fixed, with the right to Indigenous data sovereignty emerging in the context of greater data collection by governments. According to some supporters, the recognition of the prior occupation and ownership of Australia means accepting the sovereignty of Indigenous peoples and paves the way for treaties between them and both Commonwealth and state and territory governments.

Discussion of the concept was prominent in various campaigns around the failed referendum of 14 October 2023, which would have amended the Constitution to prescribe an Indigenous Voice to Parliament. Leaders of the Blak sovereignty movement such as Michael Mansell in Tasmania and Senator Lidia Thorpe in Victoria did not support the Voice, on the basis that it would affect sovereignty and that treaties are required first to engage in sovereign to sovereign discussions instead.

== Background ==
Aboriginal peoples have occupied mainland Australia for at least 65,000 years. When the British began the colonisation of Australia with the arrival of Governor Arthur Phillip and the First Fleet, no formal treaty was signed with the Aboriginal peoples of Port Jackson at the time. However, the Letters Patent establishing the Province of South Australia of 1836 (unlike the South Australia Act 1834), included recognition of potential rights held by Aboriginal people of South Australia. By 1840, all governors in Australia and New Zealand were directed that all Aboriginal customary law was to be superseded by British law and subsequently little regard was given to existing Indigenous laws and customs.

== Meaning ==
Today, Indigenous sovereignty generally relates to "inherent rights deriving from spiritual and historical connections to land". Indigenous studies academic Aileen Moreton-Robinson has written that the first owners of the land were ancestral beings of Aboriginal peoples, and "since spiritual belief is completely integrated into human daily activity, the powers that guide and direct the earth are believed to exist with all human life". The 2017 Uluru Statement from the Heart similarly expresses sovereignty as a "spiritual notion" that is "the ancestral tie between the land, or 'mother nature', and the Aboriginal and Torres Strait Islander peoples who were born therefrom". Moreton-Robinson says that for people like Captain Cook and Joseph Banks this concept of sovereignty was invisible, as it "challenge[s] the philosophical premises of state sovereignty", not sharing the same ontology as Europeans. Other important components of this concept of sovereignty were Aboriginal kinship systems, and borders based on languages and customary agreements (the equivalent of treaties), were also integral components of First Nations sovereignties. This concept of sovereignty is said to not be extinguished by settlement or force.

However, this meaning of the term is not universal, with some Indigenous communities and individuals also emphasising elements of the traditional western conception of sovereignty, such as the absolute authority of a group over a particular area and the mutual recognition of equality between sovereign bodies. This emphasis is seen in Senator Lidia Thorpe's conception of "Blak sovereignty".

== Australian legal position ==
Indigenous sovereignty has not been recognised under Australian law, whether as sovereignty that existed before colonisation or that still exists. However, some early New South Wales Supreme Court cases recognised the distinct authority of Indigenous groups. In R v Bonjon (1841) Justice Willis held that the Aboriginal people were a "distinct though dependent people, and entitled to be regarded as self-governing communities" such that the accusation that Bonjon had killed another Aboriginal person could not be decided under English law. This and the earlier case of R v Ballard (1829) appeared to reference the Marshall trilogy of US cases that recognised Native American nations as "domestic dependent nations" of the US. However, the earlier case of R v Murrell (1836) held that while the "Aboriginal natives of New Holland" were "entitled to be regarded by civilised nations as a free and independent people" they tribes had not reached "such a position in point of numbers and civilisation and to such a form of government and laws, as to be entitled to be recognised as so many sovereign states governed by laws of their own". Subsequently, the Privy Council case of Cooper v Stuart (1889) declared Australia to "practically unoccupied, without settled inhabitants or settled law".

More recently, in the case of Coe v Commonwealth (1979), the High Court of Australia rejected the notion that there existed an Aboriginal Nation that exercised sovereignty of an even limited kind. The court distinguished the US case of Cherokee Nation v. Georgia (1831), which recognised Native American nations as "domestic dependent nations" of the US, by reasoning that the Aboriginal People of Australia are not organised as a "distinct political society separated from others" and that they have never been uniformly treated as a state. It has been argued that Coe is not binding as it involved a deadlock of 2:2.

Later in Mabo v Queensland (No 2) (1992), the High Court recognised the pre-colonial land interests of Indigenous Australians within the common law of Australia in the form of native title. However, these rights did not arise due to continuing Indigenous sovereignty; the court merely held that existing rights to land held by Indigenous groups were not automatically extinguished on acquisition of sovereignty by the Crown. The court held that the validity of the acquisition of sovereignty by the Crown cannot be challenged in the courts. The case has also been interpreted by the High Court in later cases as "at odds" with the notion that any limited sovereignty exists in Indigenous groups, However, by also rejecting previous authorities that characterised Indigenous societies as "without laws, without a sovereign and primitive in their social organization" the Mabo judgment has also been taken to implicitly recognise the existence of Indigenous sovereignty prior to colonisation.

More recently in Love v Commonwealth (2020), the court upheld previous rejections of continuing Indigenous sovereignty alongside its major finding that Indigenous Australians, whether citizens or not, were not subject to the "aliens" power of the Australian Constitution and therefore could not be deported.

However, despite this legal rejection of the western exclusive view of sovereignty, Robert French (writing extrajudicially) has argued that an agreement between Indigenous Australians and the Commonwealth that recognises their traditional rights and historical connection to country would be possible "without compromising, symbolically or otherwise, Australia's identity as a nation" and that such an agreement may be made "in terms of sovereignty" where that sovereignty was "under traditional law and custom" and "may have meaning in that universe of discourse".

The Australian legal position is not shared by other comparable ex-British colonies. The US recognises the continuing tribal sovereignty of native American nations and allows a certain level of self-governance and law making. Canada recognises a certain level of sovereignty with its Indigenous Peoples, with courts upholding treaties agreed to at colonisation (such as in the case of R v Sioui) and other treaty negotiations ongoing at different levels of government. Whilst Canadian courts have recognised the de facto assertion of sovereignty by the Canadian Crown, a ruling of de jure acquisition has been avoided, with treaties identified as a way "to reconcile pre-existing Aboriginal sovereignty with assumed Crown sovereignty". In New Zealand, the Treaty of Waitangi recognised the sovereignty of the original Māori inhabitants, while also purported to transfer that sovereignty to the British Crown. While this is the established legal position in New Zealand, some have argued that the sovereignty of the Crown is limited to some extent by the treaty and that the transfer of sovereignty was ineffective due to misunderstandings and mistranslations between the English and Maori versions of the treaty.

== Activism ==
=== 20th century ===
The rights and political movements associated with Indigenous sovereignty vary significantly and there is no consensus as to what recognising Indigenous sovereignty would entail. Some earlier activists raised the possibility of full secession from Australia; however, most sought a different level of autonomy within the State. Others call for reparations, self-governance and the ability to live under traditional law unimpeded, with any future interactions between Australia and Indigenous nations to be at a minimum. The recognition of an Indigenous nation under the Commonwealth has been compared with the shared responsibility and sovereignty between the states and territories and the federal government.

From the 1920s until the 1967 referendum, the struggle for the rights of Indigenous Australians was expressed in terms of demands for full citizenship rights. The Nationality and Citizenship Act 1948 (Cth) granted nominal citizenship to Indigenous Australians, however the vast array of discriminatory laws and practices meant that they were citizens in name only. Only following the civil rights movement in Australia along with the passage of the Racial Discrimination Act 1975 (Cth) did explicit discriminatory laws end.

However, the use of the citizenship framework to agitate for rights was not uncontroversial as this framework implicitly recognised and affirmed the authority of the Australian state. There remained great suspicion that civil rights were granted as a part of a broader cultural assimilation project by the State.

Following the 1967 referendum, greater emphasis was placed on Indigenous sovereignty to call for greater self-autonomy and self-determination. New activists emerged, challenging the assumptions of the previous generation by conceptualising their struggle as that of an oppressed people rather than as minority group seeking inclusion.

In 1972, the Aboriginal Tent Embassy was established on the steps of Old Parliament House in Canberra, the Australian capital, to demand recognition of the sovereignty of Aboriginal Australian peoples. Demands of the Tent Embassy have included land rights and mineral rights to Aboriginal lands, legal and political control of the Northern Territory, and compensation for land stolen.

In 1979 author and activist Kevin Gilbert led the "National Aboriginal Government" protest on Capital Hill, Canberra, calling for acceptance of Aboriginal sovereignty.

In 1988, the Australian Bicentenary, the "Aboriginal Sovereign Treaty '88 Campaign" called for recognition of Aboriginal sovereignty and for a treaty to be enacted between the Commonwealth of Australia and Aboriginal nations under international law. Gilbert became chair of the Treaty '88 campaign. He defined the legal argument for a treaty or treaties and Aboriginal sovereignty in his 1987 work Aboriginal Sovereignty, Justice, the Law and Land.

In 1990, Pakana lawyer and academic Michael Mansell co-founded the Aboriginal Provisional Government, based on the principle that Aboriginal people "are and always have been a sovereign people". The APC has ever since been issuing its own passports, which have been officially stamped upon entry to several foreign countries as well as Indigenous territories.

=== 21st century ===
The Aboriginal Tent Embassy, still in place on its 50th anniversary as of 2022, remains a symbol of Aboriginal protest relating to various Indigenous issues. Protests have been held there against Aboriginal deaths in custody, the Howard government's 2007 Northern Territory Intervention, and cuts to services. In 2020, its most prominent issues are Aboriginal sovereignty and an acknowledgement of Indigenous right to self-determination. In 2012, there were seven tent embassies dotted around the nation.

In February 2012, barrister and 2009 Australian of the Year Mick Dodson addressed Parliament on the subject of "Constitutional Recognition of Indigenous Australians". He raised three issues: an acknowledgement in the Constitution that the Aboriginal and Torres Strait Islander peoples were in Australia first and also in possession of the country, when the British Crown asserted its sovereignty over the whole continent, and it follows that the land was taken without consent; the second was about issues of Aboriginal identity being respected and protected within the Constitution and Australian law; and the third element related to equal citizenship under law.

In March 2013, the Murrawarri Republic, comprising parcels of land in New South Wales and Queensland, announced its independence from Australia, which is not recognised nor acknowledged by the Government of Australia.

In 2014, the Sovereign Yidindji Government, followed suit, comprising traditional land of the Yidindji nation in Queensland and the Northern Territory. They issue their own postage stamps and currency.

Aboriginal activist Michael Mansell argues for a seventh state, comprising Aboriginal native title lands, along with a structure similar to state governments.

==== Uluru Statement and the Voice to Parliament ====
In 2017, the Uluru Statement from the Heart was released which stated that Aboriginal and Torres Strait Islander tribes were the original sovereign nations of the land of Australia. This sovereignty is of a spiritual nature and has never been ceded or extinguished, instead co-existing with the sovereignty of the Crown.

The document also calls for constitutional changes and reform such that "this ancient sovereignty can shine through as a fuller expression of Australia's nationhood". The reforms sought are a constitutional amendment to provide for an Indigenous Voice to Parliament, a Makarrata Commission to engage in agreement making between governments and First Nations, and a truth-telling process.

The Albanese Government held an unsuccessful referendum to establish the Voice to Parliament on 14 October 2023. As part of the debate over the Voice, Lidia Thorpe, an independent senator originally elected as a Green, expressed concerns that the Voice model would impact Indigenous sovereignty. However, government ministers, constitutional and international law scholars, and Voice advocates such as Megan Davis and Noel Pearson say that these concerns were baseless.

==== Blak sovereignty ====
After defecting from the Australian Greens in February 2023 ahead of the referendum, Lidia Thorpe said that she wished to lead the "Blak sovereignty" movement, and called for a treaty with First Nations to be signed before the implementation of the Voice. Her idea of Blak sovereignty includes the creation of a Blak Republic (as a replacement of the current constitutional monarchy) with shared sovereignty and equal power between Indigenous and non-Indigenous Australians as an ultimate goal. Her concept of sovereignty refers not just to the "native title definition that our sovereignty is a spiritual notion", but also "a position of power in this country that we've always had and that we will always have until we come to a peace agreement to be able to unite this country once and for all".

== Related issues ==
=== Treaties and constitutional recognition ===
A treaty is a legal document defining the relationship between two sovereign entities. As of 2020 there are no treaties between the Australian Government and Indigenous peoples of Australia; There are ongoing negotiations in some states and territories of Australia on the possible crafting of treaties between Indigenous peoples and governments.

A treaty between the Australian government and the country's First Peoples would at a minimum recognise symbolically Indigenous sovereignty through recognising them as independent actors not totally represented currently by the State of Australia.

There have also been moves towards constitutional changes both to recognise prior occupation and ownership (and thus sovereignty), and an Indigenous voice to parliament enshrined in the Constitution.

=== Symbolic recognition of connection to land ===
Many public events in Australia, including ceremonies, speeches, conferences and festivals, begin with a Welcome to Country or Acknowledgement of Country, intended to highlight the cultural significance of the surrounding area to a particular Aboriginal clan or language group. They are often made by elders of the nation on whose traditional lands each event is taking place. Since 2008, a Welcome to Country has been incorporated into the ceremonial opening of the Parliament of Australia, an event which occurs after each federal election.

== See also ==
- Barunga Statement
- Camp Sovereignty
- Indigenous Australian traditional custodianship
- Secession in Australia
- Indigenous sovereignty movements in other countries:
  - Hawaiian sovereignty movement
  - Indigenous self-government in Canada
  - Māori sovereignty
  - Tribal sovereignty in the United States
- Terra nullius § Australia
