= John Musgrave Waite =

English fencer (c.1820–1884)

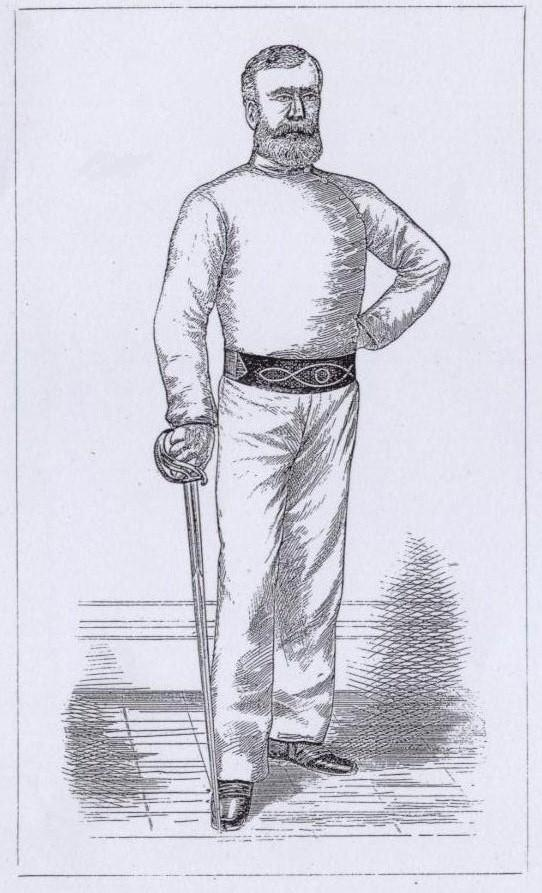
John M Waite, Professor of fencing (Note: This title is used in his book (1880))

John Musgrave Waite (c. 1820 – 13 September 1884) was a Victorian fencing master (sabre, singlestick, small-sword, foil), non-commissioned officer in the 2nd Life Guards.

A master who had a considerable following between about 1865 and 1880 was John

Musgrave Waite, formerly Corporal-Quartermaster in the Second Life Guards, a regiment in which the tradition of the sabre had always been maintained. As far as the small-sword was concerned, Waite had been the pupil of Pierre Prévost, but his speciality was the sabre and

the singlestick, about which he wrote a book called Lessons in Sabre, Singlestick, Sabre and Bayonet, and Sword Feats; or, How to use a cut and thrust Sword, published in 1880. Sir Frederick Pollock, who joined Waite's school in 1868, says that his master had never been able to acquire that lightness of hand which would have enabled him to compete with his French colleagues, but that his lessons were excellent and profitable. Waite's genius lay in teaching the sabre, the practice version of which weapon was then a most formidable affair, far different from the feather-weight Italian sabre used today.

== Sword feats ==
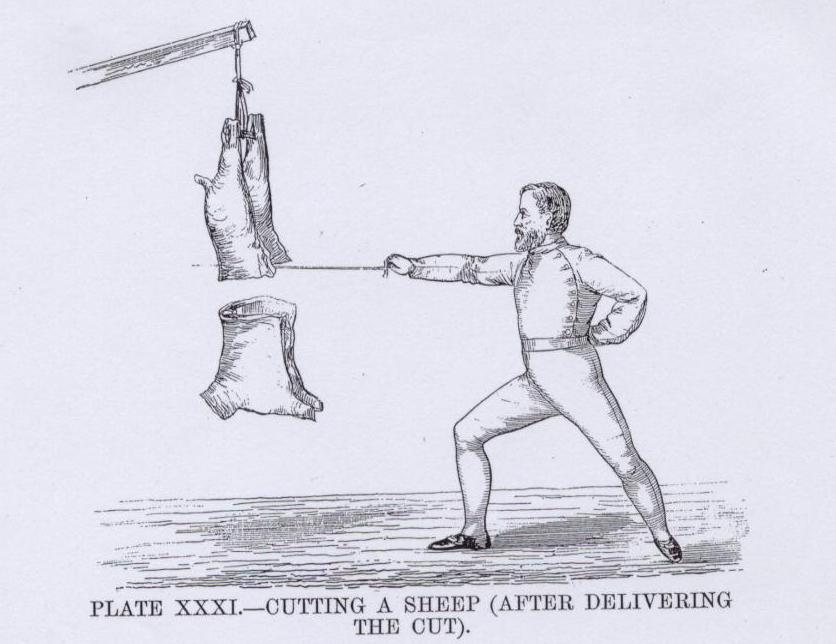
Cutting a sheep

He was famous for his public performances of difficult sabre cuts during Victorian assault-at-arms. "Corporal-Major Waite then performed a variety of sword feats, each of which was splendidly executed, viz., cutting an apple on the palm of the hand (held by Mr. Rorke), cutting an apple in a pocket-handkerchief without injuring the latter, severing a bar of lead at a stroke, and cutting through a sheep."

== Works ==
- Self-defence; or, the art of boxing: With illustrations, showing the various blows, stops, and guards. By Ned Donnelly; edited by John Musgrave Waite, Weldon & Co., 9, Southampton Street, Strand, W.C., 1879 (Note: There were several additional editions of this book: Weldon, 1881; New York: Hurst & Co.; London, Wyman, 1897.)
- Lessons in sabre, singlestick, sabre & bayonet, and sword feats : or, How to use a cut-and-thrust sword: with 34 illustrations representing the different positions, London: Weldon & Co., 1880

== See also ==
Alfred Hutton
