= Section 123 of the Constitution of Australia =

Section 123 of the Constitution of Australia details the method by which the federal parliament may alter the borders of the Australian states. It provides that any alterations must be approved by the relevant state parliament and ratified by a referendum in the relevant state.

== Text ==
The Parliament may, with the consent of the Parliament of a State, and the approval of a majority of the electors of the State voting upon the question, increase, diminish or otherwise alter the limits of the State, upon such terms and conditions as may be agreed on, and may, with the like consent, make provision respecting the effect and the operation of any such increase or diminution or alteration of territory in relation to any State affected.

== Drafting ==
Section 123 was derived from the British North America Act 1871, part of the Constitution of Canada. Andrew Inglis Clark included an equivalent section in his first draft of the constitution, although no reference was made to a referendum. Clark's original wording was retained at the 1891 Constitutional Convention in Sydney and at all further conventions. In 1899, following a conference of colonial premiers, additional wording was inserted requiring a referendum – "the approval of a majority of the electors of the State voting upon the question" – as one of the New South Wales government's conditions for joining the federation.

The impetus for the inclusion of section 123 in the federal constitution was the fear that the federal parliament would unilaterally alter state boundaries against the wishes of their residents, as the British government had done during the colonial period.

== Interpretation ==
Section 123 provides "an express safeguard against attempts by the Commonwealth to interfere with the territory of a State". Quick and Garran's Annotated Constitution, a significant early reference work in constitutional law, adopted a conservative interpretation of the referendum provisions in section 123, suggesting they would only apply to alterations of state boundaries rather than the creation of new states from existing states under sections 121 and 124 of the constitution. However, some subsequent commentators have regarded the situation as more ambiguous. Anne Twomey has noted that "there would be huge political pressure to hold such a referendum before establishing any new State" regardless of the constitutional provisions.

The provisions of section 123 also potentially conflict with section 51(xxxi), which gives the Commonwealth government the power to compulsorily acquire state property (including land) on just terms. The resolution of a conflict between the two sections would require a court to determine the threshold in which acquisition of property becomes an alteration to the "limits" of the state requiring state consent.

It has been suggested that section 123 provides an effective barrier to the creation of a unitary state in place of the federation, via the abolition of state governments. This would constitute an alteration to the "limits" of each state, thus requiring the consent of each state parliament and a majority of electors in each state, rather than the "double majority" – a national majority and a majority of electors in a majority of states – for ordinary constitutional amendments via section 128.

== Application ==
In Paterson v O'Brien (1978), the High Court considered the interaction of section 123 with section 111, which provides for state parliaments to surrender territory to the Commonwealth. The court unanimously held that a referendum was not required where a surrender of state territory occurred under section 111.

The separation of the Northern Territory from the state of South Australia and its transfer to federal control under the Northern Territory Acceptance Act 1910 occurred without a referendum, as the Price-Peake government in South Australia considered it could effect the surrender under section 122. The legality of the surrender was disputed by some contemporary commentators who considered that a referendum was required.

== Sources ==
- Brown, A. J (2007). "When does property become territory? Nuclear waste, federal land acquisition and constitutional requirements for state consent" (PDF). Adelaide Law Review. 7: 113–138.
- Twomey, Anne (2008). "Regionalism – a cure for federal ills?" (PDF). UNSW Law Journal. 31 (2): 467–492.
