= Michael Mansell =

Palawa (Tasmanian Aboriginal) lawyer and activist

Michael Mansell LLB
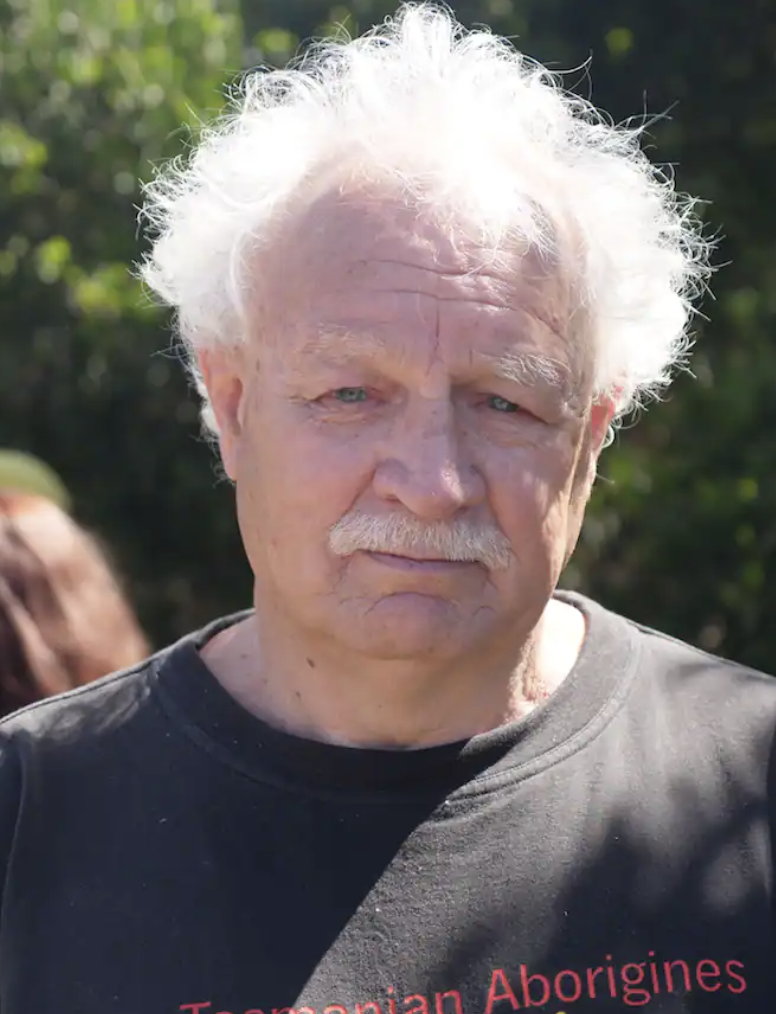

Personal details
- Born: Michael Alexander Mansell; 5 June 1951 (age 75) Launceston, Tasmania, Australia
- Education: University of Tasmania
- Occupation: Lawyer, activist

Michael Alexander Mansell (born 5 June 1951) is a Tasmanian Aboriginal (Palawa) activist and lawyer who has campaigned for social, political and legal changes.

Mansell is partly of Palawa descent from the Trawlwoolway group on his mother's side and from the Pinterrairer group on his father's side, both of which are Indigenous groups from north-eastern Tasmania.

== Early life ==
Mansell was born in 1951 in Launceston, Tasmania, the son of Clyda and Clarence Mansell. He is a third-generation Cape Barren Islander, descended from the unions of Bass Strait sealers and Aboriginal women, including Watanimarina and Thomas Beeton (parents of Lucy Beeton) and Black Judy and Edward Mansell.

Mansell's parents grew up on the Cape Barren Island reserve and moved to Launceston after World War II for employment reasons. The family remained connected with Cape Barren Island and the muttonbirding industry. As a child he lived for periods in Lefroy and George Town, attending high school in the latter. Mansell left school at the age of 15 and took a job at the Bell Bay aluminium smelter, later working for Tasmanian Government Railways as a labourer where he was "sacked when he punched a workmate who taunted him about his Aboriginal origins".

Mansell played senior Australian rules football as a young man, debuting for the Launceston Football Club at the age of 17. His football career was interrupted by a serious car accident, but he later returned to high-level football with the North Hobart Football Club.

== Legal career ==
From an early age, Mansell was a radical protester about the status and treatment of Tasmanian Aboriginal people within the community. However he discovered that mere protest was an ineffective measure to achieve his aims of land rights and improved conditions, and the radical tactics that he and other Indigenous rights protesters employed in the 1970s were abandoned.

Mansell undertook a degree in law at the University of Tasmania, graduating in 1983. He began a career as a lawyer, attempting to defend the rights of Aboriginal people, whilst pursuing an agenda of reform. Since then, he has become a qualified barrister and solicitor of the Supreme Court of Tasmania, and the High Court of Australia.

In 1972, he and others set up the Tasmanian Aboriginal Centre, of which he was chairman and legal manager. He was also the founding secretary of the Aboriginal Provisional Government in 1990. Mansell also played senior football for North Hobart in the Tasmanian Football League

Mansell was named "Aboriginal of the Year", at the 1987 National NAIDOC (National Aboriginal and Islander Day Observance Committee) Awards, and played a crucial role in the drafting of legislation for the Native Title Act 1993 that arose from the Mabo v Queensland case.

Mansell was an independent candidate to represent Tasmania in the Australian Senate at the 1987 Australian federal election held on 11 July 1987. He was unsuccessful, receiving 1,102 votes (21,451 votes were required to win a seat).

== Publications ==
Subjects that Mansell has written about include the Australian Constitution, Aboriginal customary law, cultural and intellectual property, the Human Genome Project, land rights and Aboriginal sovereignty. In 2016 his book Treaty and Statehood: Aboriginal self-determination was published.

== Activism and commentary ==
In the wider Australian community, Mansell has often been seen as controversial, having resorted to confrontational tactics to push issues of Indigenous rights and past mistreatment onto the public agenda in Tasmania. Mansell has often been involved in public confrontation with politicians and the media. One area where he is most in conflict with the Australian and Tasmanian governments is over the issue of Aboriginal Sovereignty.

In April 1987, Mansell spoke at a Libyan conference sponsored by Muammar Gaddafi, called "A Conference on Peace and Revolution in the Pacific". The conference also included leaders from separatist movements in the Pacific, such as those in New Caledonia, Papua, East Timor, and Aceh. It provoked a negative reaction from the Australian government, who viewed Gaddafi as intentionally trying to destabilize the Pacific, as he had done in other regions.

To gain international attention for the cause of Tasmanian Aboriginal people, Mansell established an alternative Aboriginal passport. In 1988 he secured recognition for the passport from Gaddafi's Libya, which declared it valid for travel to Libya. Mansell said he had Gaddafi's support for the establishment of an independent Aboriginal nation.

Mansell has suggested that Indigenous Australians should be granted a separate state or territory within Australia, which would be governed by Indigenous people and allow for greater self-determination

In 2001 Mansell stated that "there were more phoney than real Aborigines in Tasmania and more than half the voters in the 1996 ATSIC election were not Aboriginal". The Tasmanian Aboriginal Centre brought court challenges against the claims of Aboriginality of a number of candidates to the Aboriginal and Torres Strait Islander Commission.

In February 2008 Mansell said on Australian radio that although he was happy that the new Prime Minister Kevin Rudd would offer a formal public apology on behalf of all Australians for the treatment of the "Stolen Generations", he referred to it as a "half-measure" if it was without compensation. On the first anniversary of the apology, Mansell said that the apology had not improved the situation of Aborigines, nor had the government stopped welfare policies based on race.

Mansell was one of 16 "fair-skinned Aboriginal people" named in a series of articles written by Andrew Bolt and published in the Herald Sun newspaper in 2009. These articles were subsequently found by the Federal Court of Australia in the case Eatock v Bolt to have contravened Section 18C of the Racial Discrimination Act 1975.

In his 2016 book Treaty and Statehood: Aboriginal Self-determination, Mansell advocated for a seventh Australian state to be run by indigenous people on land currently deeded to native title, complete with its own state parliament and court system. He also said that such a state may not be created for "at least two or three decades", and felt that treaties or designated seats in the Federal Parliament are more politically likely.

In January 2020, Mansell (as chairman of the Aboriginal Land Council of Tasmania) issued a three-page statement saying he does not believe Bruce Pascoe has Indigenous ancestry, and Pascoe should stop claiming he does.
