= Murrawarri Republic =

Micronation

- Micronation (unrecognised entity)
- Location: portions of New South Wales and Queensland, Australia
- Area claimed: 81,796 km^{2} (31,582 sq mi)
- Claimed by: Fred Hooper
- Dates claimed: 30 March 2013–8 May 2013 (Declaration response deadline)

The Murrawarri Republic is a micronation that declared its independence from Australia in 2013 and claims territory and sovereignty over an area straddling the border of the states of New South Wales and Queensland within Australia. The territory is the traditional homeland of the Murrawarri people, an Aboriginal people, but the population of the territory claimed now comprises mostly non-Indigenous Australians. The Government of Australia has not acknowledged the declaration of independence, and their independence has been wholly unrecognised.

== Declaration of the Continuance of the State of Murrawarri Nation ==
On 30 March 2013, the Murrawarri Republic released a declaration announcing its independence. The Peoples Council of the Murrawarri gave the Queen of England (Elizabeth II), the Prime Minister of Australia (Julia Gillard), as well as the Premiers of Queensland (Campbell Newman) and New South Wales (Barry O'Farrell) 21 days to respond to the declaration.

The specific requests made to Queen Elizabeth II were:

- Treaty documents between the Murrawarri Nation and the Crown of Great Britain outlining the conditions of such a treaty,
- A Deed of Cession document that show the Murrawarri Nation has ceded Sovereignty, Dominion and Ultimate (Radical) to the Crown of Great Britain, or
- Documents showing a declaration of war against the Murrawarri Nation and its people by the Crown of Great Britain.

The deadline expired on 8 May 2013, with the Crown failing to give a response. The Council interpreted their failure to produce the requested documents to be affirmation by the Crown of "the Murrawarri Republic to be a continued Free and Independent State, in line with International law and covenants". On 12 May 2013, the Murrawarri people took their sovereignty campaign to the United Nations, asking that they be recognized as the world's newest country. On 13 May 2013, the Murrawarri Republic established a Ministry of Defence. The Declaration of Continued Independence, states that there shall be a referendum for the establishment of the elected not later than 1 April 2014 and that until such a referendum the People's Council shall act as the governing body.

On 30 May 2013, Time reported that Attorney-General’s Department of the Australian Government had not replied because there was no legal basis for a reply, a view backed by George Newhouse, a Sydney-based human-rights lawyer known for his work with Indigenous Australians.

== Geography ==
The Murrawarri Republic website identifies its territory as being roughly triangular in shape, traversing the Queensland/New South Wales border with its easterly apex close to the two state borders about 600 km from the Pacific Ocean, on the landward side of the Great Dividing Range, its north-westerly apex close to the Queensland town of Cunnamulla and its southwesterly apex at the confluence of the Darling and Warrego Rivers. It is roughly 200 km from east to west and about 250 km from north to south. The republic’s website quotes its area as being 81,796 km^{2}, but this area is inconsistent with measurements taken from the map. (Note: The area of 81,796 km^{2} quoted on the website does not correspond with the coordinates cited in the same website. If the territory claimed is approximated by a triangle with its northerly apex at 28°9′29″S 145°52′11″E, its southerly apex at 30°24′15″S 145°20′51″E (quoted in the website) and its easterly coordinate at 29°0′0″S 147°31′49″E (estimated using A55 and A71 highways as reference points), the triangle will have sides of 263.3 km, 186.5 km and 254.6 km respectively. Using Heron's formula, such a triangle has an area of about 22,500 km^{2}, significantly less than the quoted area of the territory—namely 81,796 km^{2}. See the related research published by Abbondanza in 2018.)

The micronation uses Australian currency.

The inconsistency between Murrawarri's land claim and the claimed land's true area has been specifically examined in a study published by Indigenous Policy Journal, which confirms that Murrawarri's true area is about 22,170 km^{2}, less than one third of what is officially claimed. The study also concluded that "the proclamation of the Republic of Murrawarri is currently exerting a significant influence over similar contexts in Australia", thus reinforcing the debate on Aboriginal sovereignty.

The First Peoples Worldwide website quotes the population of the Murrawarri republic as being approximately 4,000, but this value is inconsistent with census figures. (Note: Maps published by the Murrawarri Provisional Council of State show that most, if not all, of the republic lies within the Shire of Paroo (Queensland) or Bourke Shire (New South Wales): the 2010 census quotes the Shire of Paroo as having a population of 1951 and Bourke Shire as having a population of 2868. Of this total of 4819, 3362 (or 69.76%) of the population of these shires are shown as living in the towns of Bourke and Cunnamulla, which lie outside the republic, leaving a population of about 1450.)

The dominant vegetation and climate, based on the Köppen classification, is described as hot, persistently dry grassland. The average maximum and minimum temperatures in January are about 36°C and 18°C respectively and in July are 22°C and 5°C respectively. The rainfall is approximately 360 mm per annum, with more rain falling in the summer than in the winter. (Note: These figures are the averages of the figures for Bourke and Cunnamulla.)

The Mitchell Highway (A71) traverses the territory from north to south.

== Provisional Council of State ==
"Today is a historic moment. The Murrawarri Republic now has a formal interim government that is responsible for the governance of the Republic. This day is very significant as it begins to free the Murrawarri Peoples from the tyranny of our colonial oppressors"

–Fred Hooper at the first meeting of the People's Council

The Provisional Council of State is the governing body of the Murrawarri Republic. The first meeting of the People's Council was held at Weilmoringle on 13 July 2013, where the meeting passed a unanimous resolution to establish the Provisional Council of State.

It is made up of 11 members, who are Fred Hooper (the leader), Kevin Hooper, Phyllis Cubby, Evelyn Barker, Sam Jefferies, Desmond Jones, Phillip Sullivan, Julie Johnston, Gloria Johnston, Sharni Hooper, and Alison Salt. Fred Hooper is the current chairman of the Provisional Council of State.

== Flag meaning ==
The brown represents the land, and the light blue represents the sky, where Murrawarri spirits reside until their return on the falling star, as well as the water and the people. Together, the colors represent mother earth. The white star in the upper left corner has eight points which represent the eight clan groups of the Murrawarri Republic.

== See also ==
- Australian Indigenous sovereignty
- List of active separatist movements in Oceania
- List of micronations
- List of proposed states of Australia
- List of states with limited recognition
