= Associação Democratica para a Integração de Timor-Leste na Austrália =

The Associação Democratica para a Integração de Timor-Leste na Austrália (ADITLA), (transl. Democratic Association for the integration of Timor-leste into Australia) was a group founded in November 1974 in the colony of Portuguese Timor that campaigned for the annexation of East Timor into Australia.

== History ==
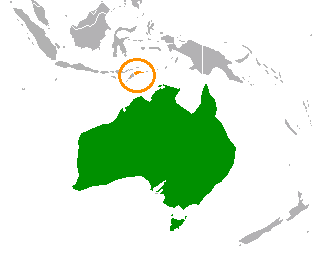
Portuguese-Timor (orange), North of Australia

After the Carnation Revolution in Portugal in 1974, various parties emerged in the colony in preparation for independence, including ADITLA in November. It was the idea and of businessman Henrique Pereira, a then 55-year-old Chinese-born businessman.

The party appealed to the Timorese of Chinese origin, who were worried both about the left wing Fretilin party and of annexation into Indonesia. Instead of independence, the ADITLA sought annexation into neighbouring Australia. This fear of annexation into Indonesia was fueled by the Indonesian mass killings of 1965–66 when many ethnic Chinese were killed.

The ADITLA is accused of being created for Henriques financial gain. As he received 50 Australian cents for every membership to the party, which was half the daily wage of a Timorese worker.

Pereira had worked with the Australian army during the Battle of Timor against the Japanese during the Second World War, he thus had a lot of contacts with former Australian soldiers who were now businessmen in Sydney. He suggested that in the event of war he could help the ADITLA members escape to Australia, where a Portuguese city would then be founded especially for them. At the end of November the party had 8,000 members.

In February 1975 the name was changed to Associação para a União Democrática de Timor-Leste e Austrália [Association for the Democratic union of East Timor and Australia] Pereira wanted to recruit more members thus by the end of March the membership had increased to 10,000 people. The Australian Government though, not only refused to support the party, it bluntly rejected the proposal to admit East Timor into the Commonwealth. On the 12th of March, the colony's only newspaper published the Australian diplomatic stance and questioned the legitimacy of the party, thus it quickly dissolved.

In an interview, party founder Pereira later explained that ADITLA never had a program. The sole aim was to demand integration into Australia, even if Australia did not want that.

== See also ==
- History of East Timor
- Chinese People in East Timor
