= Wiradjuri Central West Republic =

Declared sovereign Aboriginal nation

Wiradjuri Central West Republic Micronation
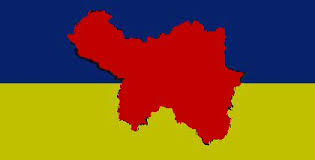
- Flag
- Status: Current
- Location: Part of New South Wales, Australia
- Capital: Wellington, New South Wales
- Official languages: Wiradjuri, Australian English
- Ethnic groups: Wiradjuri; European Australians
- Religion: Dreamtime Religion
- Demonym(s): Wiradjuri
- Organizational structure: Republic
- Purported currency: Australian dollar (AUD)
- Time zone: UTC+10:00; UTC+11:00 (DST; NSW territory only)

The Wiradjuri Central West Republic is an unrecognized Aboriginal nation of Wiradjuri people, one of several micronations of Aboriginal peoples that have declared independence in Australia.
