= Sovereign Yidindji Government =

Aboriginal Australian micronation

- Micronation (unrecognised entity)
Sovereign Yidindji Government
- Region
- Coordinates: 16°55′49″S 145°46′13″E
- Country: Australia
- Mean max temp: 29.0 °C (84.2 °F)
- Mean min temp: 20.8 °C (69.4 °F)
- Annual rainfall: 1,999.7 mm (78.73 in)
- Location: Part of Queensland, Australia
- Area claimed: 2,500 km^{2} (970 sq mi)
- Claimed by: Gudju Gudju Gimuybara; Murrumu Walubara Yidindji
- Dates claimed: 2014–present

The Sovereign Yidindji Government or Yidindji Tribal Nation is an Aboriginal Australian micronation that claims to exercise Australian Aboriginal sovereignty. Led by Murrumu Walubara Yidindji, members of the Yidindji nation renounced legal ties with Australia in 2014. The land they claim lies in the state of Queensland and stretches "south of Port Douglas, through Cairns, inland across the Atherton Tablelands and 80 kilometres (50 mi) out to sea”. The chief minister is Gudju Gudju Gimuybara, while Murrumu is foreign affairs and trade minister.

The Yidindji government is hoping to enter into a memorandum of understanding with the Commonwealth of Australia. It is also "reaching out to countries like Russia and Venezuela to establish diplomatic relations".

The Yidindji nation has its own driver licensing system. Murrumu was charged by the Queensland Police Service in May 2015 after being caught with a license and registration plates issued by the Yidindji government and not by the Queensland government. Murruma claimed that the Queensland police has no jurisdiction over him.

In 2022 the micronation launched the 'Sovereign Yidindji Dollar', a central bank digital currency pegged to the Australian dollar and claimed to be backed by gold and silver bars.

== Government ==
Portfolio	Minister
Chief Minister	Gudju-Gudju Gimuybara
Foreign Affairs Minister	Murrumu Walubara Yidindji
Trade Minister	Murrumu Walubara Yidindji
Communications & Broadband Minister	Murrumu Walubara Yidindji
Financial Technology	Murrumu Walubara Yidindji
Renewable Energy	Murrumu Walubara Yidindji
Attorney General	Gaan-Yarra Yalmabara
Minister for Elders	Koey Kula
Home Affairs Minister	Darigan Lima
Education Minister	Yirrilam Gooraminya
Social Affairs Minister	Yirrilam Gooraminya
Police Minister	Bumi Gimuybara
Minister for Cultural Affairs	Bumi Gimuybara

== See also ==
- Australian Indigenous Sovereignty
