= Aboriginal Provisional Government =

Indigenous Australian independence movement

- Aboriginal Provisional Government logo
- Abbreviation: APG
- Formation: 1990
- Type: Aboriginal organisation
- Legal status: Active
- Purpose: Advocate and public voice, educator and network
- Headquarters: Tasmania, Australia
- Region served: Australia
- Official language: English
- Website: Aboriginal Provisional Government

The Aboriginal Provisional Government (APG) is an Indigenous Australian independence movement in Australia.

== History ==
=== Earlier activity ===
The idea of an Aboriginal government was developed by some Aboriginal delegates of the Federation of Land Councils at its meeting at JaJa in the Northern Territory in 1990. The Federation was a powerful national body but which pretty much limited its involvement to land issues. Some Federation members felt the Aboriginal cause had to move to another level, and the name of any new body should reflect a broader horizon while complementing existing Aboriginal groups. The "Provisional" aspect was included for two reasons: first, this Aboriginal body would foster a transition from white government control to an eventual full-blown black national government. Second, the APG was not set up to govern Aboriginal people but to be a political vehicle for self-determination aspirations. Bob Weatherall, Josie Crawshaw, Geoff Clark, Clarrie Isaacs, Michael Mansell, Robbie Thorpe, Kathy Craigie, and Lyall Munro Jnr were founding members of the APG.

Charles Perkins' early efforts of freedom rides in NSW and his public arguments with politicians (and his boss at Department of Aboriginal Affairs), affected younger APG members. Perkins' later organisation of Aboriginal football carnivals led to Clark and Mansell first meeting. Development of early APG political thought to move away from Australian Government dependence took its roots in academic writings of Kevin Gilbert's "Treaty 88", Oodgeroo Noonuccal's and Jack Davis' poetry, and Paul Coe's litigation for Aboriginal sovereignty in Coe v Commonwealth in 1978.

=== Foundation of the APG ===
Word quickly spread about the formation of the APG. The first public announcement of formation of the APG took place at Tranby College, Glebe, Sydney in 1990 run by Kevin Cook. In 1992 the APG held a national meeting at Hobart, Tasmania, where an Elders Council was established. Queenslander Joe McGuiness, a strong unionist and campaigner for the 1967 referendum, headed up the Elders Council.

The APG issues Aboriginal passports and Aboriginal birth certificates. Passports are a way of declaring national black identity and are often used by young Aboriginals as an identity document. Birth certificates are issued so that Aboriginal children are not forced to be registered at birth with the Commonwealth of Australia. Jack Davis, a well-known Aboriginal poet from WA, gave APG permission to use part of his poem about an Aboriginal nation. The APG letterhead carries Jack's words at the bottom of the page.

The Australian government shunned the APG after the APG declared it would only meet on a government to government basis, not as a lobby group. Members of the APG eventually met with Prime Minister Paul Keating on native title legislation (as part of the 'B' Team). Michael Mansell had been involved earlier in native title deliberations after he was elected to a representative body by a national Aboriginal meeting of 400 people at Eva Valley in the Northern Territory to protect the Mabo High Court gains. However, Mansell later refused to go with his co-Aboriginal delegates to sign off on the final legislation with Keating because Mansell refused to validate invalid grants. Such validation only targeted Aboriginal native title, while leaving white land interests intact. This was a reproduction of Joh Bjelke-Petersen's attempted anti-native title law which was struck down by the High Court in Mabo. Keating and the 'A' team got around the discriminatory move by suspending the operation of the Racial Discrimination Act.

Deputy Chair Geoff Clark, was elected as national head of ATSIC. Clark advocated within ATSIC for a treaty and found widespread support. His Board established a Treaty committee and published 'Let's Treaty Now'. When John Howard was elected Australian Prime Minister, he immediately made it harder for Aborigines to get native title and sacked ATSIC. The treaty proposal lapsed.

The APG has produced 4 volumes of written materials: Vol. 1 Aboriginal Government; Vol. 2 the national conference; Vol. 3 the Australian Constitution and Vol. 4 Mabo.

The APG argues that Aborigines were a sovereign people before the white invasion in 1788 and nothing has changed to remove that sovereign status, that by virtue of their status as a distinct people, Aborigines (and Torres Strait Islanders) have the right to self-determination which includes the right to choose their own destiny, and that that choice is not limited to being subordinate to white policy makers for Aborigines are a people able to take their place among the nations of the world as equals, not as mere citizens of the invader.

The APG acknowledges the range of choices of peoples includes assimilation and self-management through to US type domestic Indian nations, a 7th State of Australia or a completely independent Aboriginal government. They hold that, as the international law constraint of territorial integrity does not apply to emerging nations, Aboriginals are free to be a partnership with Australia or politically independent of it.

The APG encourages Aboriginal groups to take advantage of reconciliation, land rights, native title or government sponsored programs provided people do not lose sight of their greater entitlements beyond welfare. The APG vigorously opposes Aboriginal advisory bodies arguing white politicians should not be deciding the fate of Aborigines no matter who advises them. The APG rejected the Julia Gillard/expert panel suggested constitutional changes as a sell-out, on the basis that the suggestions promoted white superiority (English should be official language whereas in New Zealand Maori is an official language) and failed to mention at all Aboriginal sovereignty. The APG advocates for the words "Aborigines and Torres Strait Islanders have the right to self determination" to be inserted in the constitution.

== See also ==
- Aboriginal Tent Embassy (est. 1972)
- Australian Indigenous Sovereignty
- Murrawarri Republic (est. 2013)
