= Kingdom of Calontir =

Arms of the Kingdom of Calontir

The Kingdom of Calontir is one of twenty "kingdoms", or regions, of the Society for Creative Anachronism (SCA), an international organization dedicated to researching and recreating aspects of the Middle Ages.

Calontir is located in the Midwestern United States and includes about 40 local SCA groups in Kansas, Nebraska, Missouri, Iowa, and (the Fayetteville area of) Arkansas. Calontir is bordered on the east by the Middle Kingdom, on the south by the kingdoms of Gleann Abhann and Ansteorra, on the west by the Kingdom of the Outlands, and on the north by the Kingdom of Northshield.

== Identity ==
The name Calontir is believed by many to be Welsh for "Heartland"; however, that is incorrect. "Heartland" as a single word in Welsh would be "perfeddwlad." "Heart land" as two words more closely resembles "Calontir;" it translated into Welsh as "tir y galon" or "Calondir." Over time the error has become common usage. It began as a principality within the Middle Kingdom in 1981-2 (AS XVI in the SCA's own calendar) and on February 18, 1984 (AS XVIII) became the tenth kingdom of the SCA. The first king and queen of Calontir were known as Chepe l’Orageux and Arwyn Antaradi.

The arms of the kingdom, registered January 1984, are: Purpure, a cross of Calatrava, in chief a crown, within in bordure a laurel wreath Or.

== History ==
The Kingdom of Calontir became the tenth kingdom of the Society for Creative Anachronism (SCA) on February 18, 1984 (A.S. XVIII), at an event held in the Shire of Mag Mor in Lincoln, Nebraska.

It was formed from the Middle Kingdom and became the first of the so-called “Sons of the Dragon,” along with Northshield and Ealdormere. The kingdom includes most of Missouri, Kansas, Nebraska (except the far west, which belongs to the Outlands), Iowa (excluding the Quad Cities region), and parts of northwest Arkansas.

Calontir’s early development was influenced by its geographic distance from the Midrealm’s centers of activity. Early leaders organized a regional council called the Witan and developed a two-tier award system that recognized local achievement.

Cultural identity played a significant role in Calontir’s formation. Influenced by early medieval, particularly Anglo-Saxon, themes, the kingdom adopted titles such as Fyrd and Hirth for its fighting orders and encouraged collective identity through traditions such as communal singing and the use of the Falcon emblem.

Calontir’s first King and Queen, Chepe l’Oragere and Arwyn Antaradi, were crowned in 1984. The new kingdom soon established its own customs, including open-entry Crown Tournaments and the practice of wearing matching tabards in war to emphasize collective identity. Calontir gained a reputation for highly organized unit tactics on the battlefield, first demonstrated at Pennsic and later at other interkingdom wars such as Estrella and Gulf Wars.

The kingdom’s principal annual event, the War of the Lilies, was founded in the 1980s and has become a major regional war and arts event held each June near Smithville Lake, Missouri. It features martial activities, arts and sciences classes, and kingdom traditions such as communal feasts and crafts demonstrations.

Calontir’s award system evolved into a three-tier structure of Awards of Arms, Grants of Arms, and Peerages, covering service, arts, sciences, and martial skill. Over time it expanded to include archery and equestrian arts. Calontir was the last SCA kingdom to formally recognize fencing, which it incorporated in the early 2010s under the name “Calontir Steel /Stile”, with a primary (default) focus on Cut & Thrust due to the rules and requirements adherence to more realistic combat considerations consistent with the early Middle Ages Period.

The kingdom is also widely recognized for its bardic traditions and group singing, often celebrating historical and local events through original songs.

== Culture ==
Calontir has a distinctive cultural flavor, as does each kingdom in the SCA. Calontir is known for its cohesive presence at war, every individual in the Calontir army dressed in the kingdom's livery (purple with a golden falcon) and fighting in a huge shield wall, units marching into battle singing in unison, as if "a kingdom that runs like a household." This cohesiveness may be influenced by traditional attitudes on the Great Plains, where strong communities have evolved out of farmers' cooperatives, formed long ago to ensure mutual survival against the elements of the American frontier.

Drawing on its name and the culture of its founding group, Calontir is often associated with pre-Conquest England, an identity reflected in many of its songs, which convey the perspective of the downtrodden more often than the triumphant. This focus on pre-12th century England may have been a factor in Calontir's distinction as the last kingdom in the SCA to recognize SCA fencing.

== Events ==
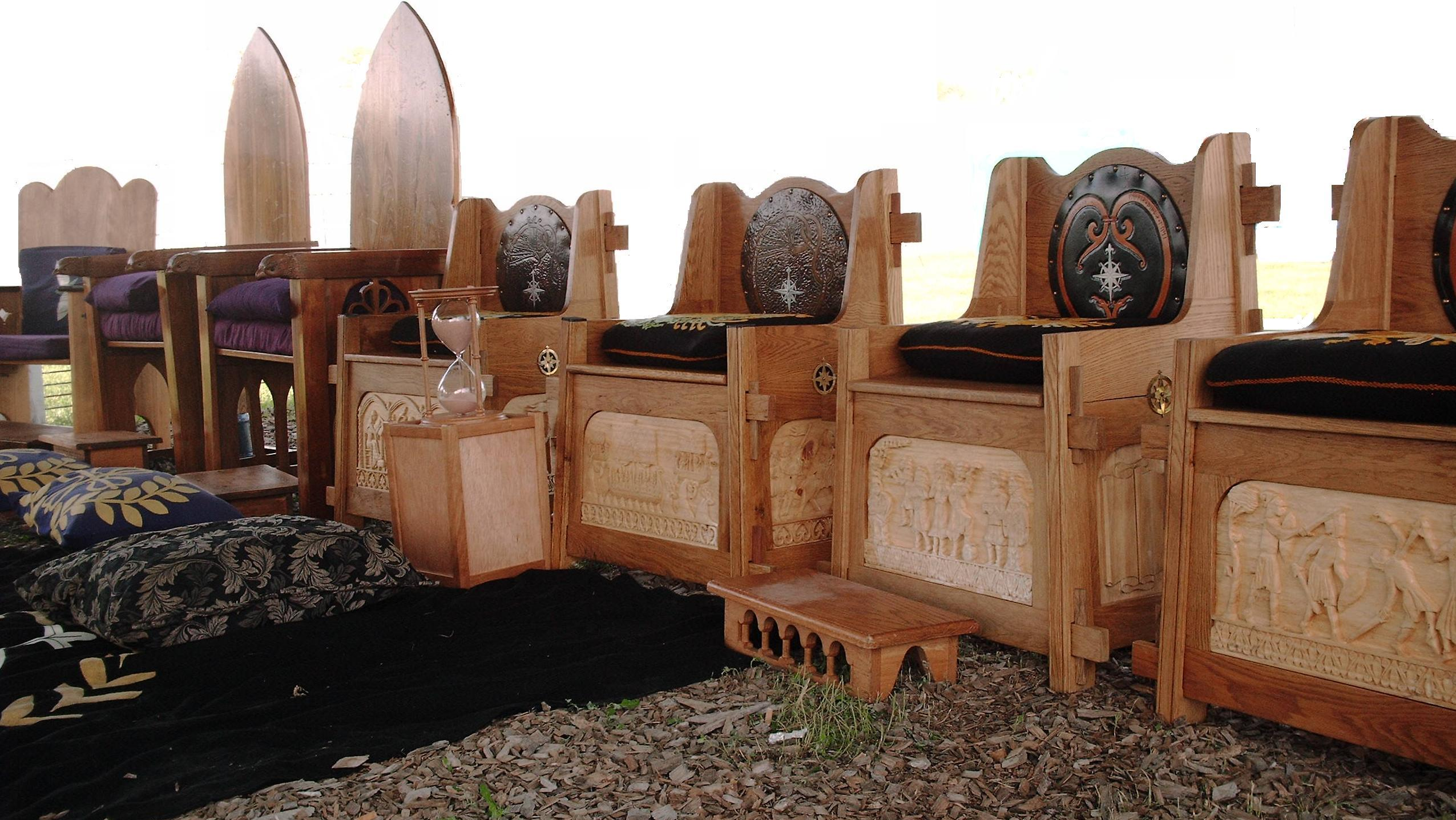
Thrones of Calontir (left) next to those of Northshield (right) at a joint event of the two kingdoms.

Local groups in Calontir, as in other SCA kingdoms, host local and kingdom-level events throughout the year, which include SCA combat tournaments, Arts and Sciences competitions, seasonal feasts, etc. The Kingdom of Calontir annually hosts the War of the Lilies, a nine-day camping event each June, which in recent years has attracted about a thousand SCA members for combat and other activities. The first Lilies War was held in 1987 at Perry Lake in Kansas. Since 1992, the event has been held at Smithville Lake in Missouri. Unlike most SCA wars, which exploit inter-kingdom rivalries, Lilies War is a themed event, the contending groups based upon the theme of the year. According to the Lilies War Committee charter, "the theme may not place the Kingdom of Calontir against another group". Some of the events that take place are armored combat, archery, Arts and Sciences demonstrations and competitions, classes, feasting, games, youth activities, and shopping in the period markets and food court. Kingdom-level events in Calontir include the Kingdom Arts and Sciences Competition, the Queen's Prize Arts and Sciences Tournament, various symposia (Clothier's Seminar, Cooking Symposium, etc.), and combat tournaments such as the semi-annual Crown Tournament (which decide the future heirs to the crown).

== Local groups ==
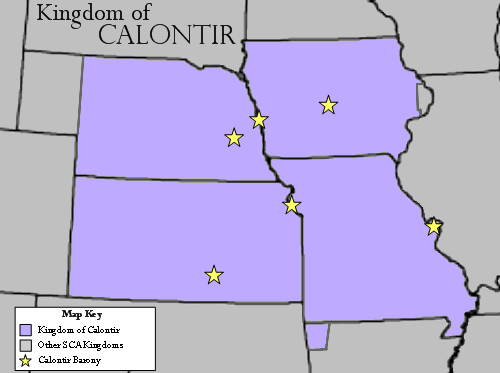
A map of the Kingdom of Calontir. Stars indicate the location of baronies.

In the SCA, a barony is the largest type of local group, usually arising in areas of dense population and requiring a core of at least 25 paid, active members (though more people may participate occasionally or not become paid members). Baronies are run by a baron and baroness, who represent the king and queen. Calontir has six baronies:

- Barony of Forgotten Sea (Kansas City metropolitan area): Founded as a shire of the Middle Kingdom in November 1976 after an earlier group (the Shire of the Fountains) had disbanded, Forgotten Sea became a barony on February 10, 1979. They are home to Calontir's first female knight, Ariel of Glastonbury Tor, who has also reigned four times as Queen of Calontir.
- Barony of the Lonely Tower (Omaha, Nebraska): Lonely Tower was founded as a shire of the Middle Kingdom in July 1979 and became a barony on June 21, 1986.
- Barony of the Three Rivers (St. Louis, Missouri): The second SCA group in St. Louis by that name (an earlier one, now known as the "Lost Colony of Three Rivers", had disbanded), Three Rivers was founded as a shire in 1975; when it was created a barony on May 27, 1978, it was the first barony in what would become Calontir, and also the only one until Forgotten Sea became a barony in 1979.
- Barony of Coeur d'Ennui (Des Moines, Iowa): Founded as a shire of the Middle Kingdom in October, 1982, Coeur d'Ennui became a barony of Calontir in July, 1984.
- Barony of Mag Mor (Lincoln, Nebraska): Mag Mor was founded as a shire of the Middle Kingdom in October 1982. Still a shire at the time, they hosted the coronation of the first king and queen of Calontir in 1984. Mag Mor became a barony in January 1996.
- Barony of Vatavia (Wichita, Kansas): Vatavia began as a shire in January, 1983, and became a barony of Middle Kingdom in August, 1983.

The Barony of Dumnonia was founded in Iowa City, Iowa in December 1975, but became defunct before the founding of Calontir. The Iowa City area is now home to the Shire of Shadowdale.

The typical local SCA group, somewhat smaller than a barony, is a shire. There are 19 shires in Calontir and one shire-march (a shire on the border between two kingdoms), called Grimfells, which is in the Fayetteville, Arkansas area. Colleges are similar to shires but located in areas with large student populations; Calontir has two colleges (Bellewode in Kirksville, Missouri and No Mountain in Grinnell, Iowa). It also has three cantons, which are "fiefdoms" of a barony distant enough to be able to have meetings and events of their own but close enough to not be independent shires, and several unofficial local contacts in areas with too small a membership to form an official group.

== See also ==
- Society for Creative Anachronism activities
- SCA heavy combat
- The West Kingdom
- Kingdom of Lochac
- Kingdom of the Outlands
