= Society for Creative Anachronism activities =

The Society for Creative Anachronism (SCA) is a medieval reenactment group with an international membership, founded in California in 1966. Members of the group participate, to a greater or lesser extent, in a wide variety of activities based on those found in pre-1601 CE cultures. The vast majority of interests in the SCA are either combat-focused, or focused on the day-to-day crafts of the period, known within the Society as A&S (Arts & Sciences). Gatherings of the SCA are events, at which attempts at pre-17th century costume must be worn, and practices or meetings, at which costuming is largely up to each member's discretion—although sufficient safety equipment must always be worn for practicing combat skills.

== Arts and sciences ==
Within the SCA, more or less all activities which are not specifically combat-related are considered to be Arts & Sciences (A&S). These run the entire gamut of skills used in the medieval world, ranging from decorative and performing arts to practical skills such as baking, weaving, woodworking, and blacksmithing. Those who demonstrate excellence in any field, or multiple fields, may find themselves nominated for awards at various levels, the highest of which is a Society-wide award known as the Order of the Laurel, awarded for outstanding dedication to medieval knowledge.

=== Bardic arts ===
The bard in pre-medieval Celtic society held a specific social class and had specific duties. In the SCA context, though, "bard" refers to most storytellers, poets, and musicians. Many early music performers prefer to use terms more appropriate to the location and time of their persona, and may call themselves minstrels, troubadours, trouvères, minnesingers, skalds, or other historical terms for performing artists. A common bardic activity at SCA events is the "bardic circle," in which performers take turns sharing pieces. Circles may be more or less structured, and may or may not have themes. Musicians and storytellers often perform at SCA feasts, combat events, camping events, and coronations and investitures. At camping events, many bards (or groups) may walk from campsite to campsite performing stories and songs. Within the Society it is generally considered polite to welcome such a person, and provide them with a small amount of food or drink as thanks for the performance.

SCA musicians and storytellers not only perform historical period pieces but often compose new period-style works, some of which are based on SCA culture. These may be in the style of ancient forms, such as a new version of a Child Ballad, or a piece recounting (in period style) some aspect of the "Current Middle Ages" such as a history of an SCA kingdom, a tribute to an individual, or an account of an event. Filking, the often-humorous setting of new lyrics to an extant tune, is also a common performance style. This practice has ample historical antecedent; ancient musical codices are full of tropes that set new lyrics to existing tunes.

=== Blacksmithing ===
The Society's interest in replicating period arms and armor has also led to a large group of people interested in historical blacksmithing.

=== Brewing ===
The brewing of beers, ales, and meads is a highly popular activity across the entire Society.

=== Calligraphy and illumination ===
Calligraphy is the art of writing beautifully, while illumination is the artwork decorating the page, usually with paint and gold leaf. Together these arts are used to create illuminated manuscripts, individual pages of which are commonly called "scrolls" within the SCA, and generally accompany awards granted by the royalty and aristocracy. Scrolls are also sometimes made to commemorate winning a tournament or competition, or an agreement between two parties within the context of the SCA. The Society members who are interested in these arts, and who produce these scrolls, commonly refer to themselves as scribes. Most Kingdoms have formal groups of scribes who are responsible for producing these documents and teaching the arts, generally under the direction of an officer whose title usually includes the word "signet". In the East Kingdom, for example, the officer is known as the Tyger Clerk of the Signet. Despite the fact that period documents of this sort, such as letters patent, usually contained little illumination, scrolls are commonly modeled after the pages in Books of Hours, Bibles or other medieval and Renaissance manuscripts, including elaborately painted borders around the text. Over the Society's history, the arts of calligraphy and illumination have advanced substantially, so that many scribes now use completely authentic materials and tools.

Scribes often attempt to match the period and style of a scroll to the persona of the recipient. While most scrolls are done on paper or vellum, this has occasionally led to SCA scribes creating works on objects ranging from stone tablets to drinking horns, and in at least one case, on sheet metal inscribed with Braille. This kind of creativity is generally encouraged, as long as the resulting object is appropriate to the occasion.

=== Cooking ===
Many SCA events feature food ranging from simple "fighter's fare" or a "peasant lunch" of bread, cheese, hard-boiled eggs, and a simple vegetable or meat soup, to elaborate multi-course feasts served over a period of several hours. Such feasts may focus on dishes from England, France, Italy, Germany, Spain, or other locations and times within the SCA's period of study. Common dishes are roasted beef or chickens with mustard or other sauces on the side, meat pies, cheese-filled ravioli, green salads, "armored turnips" (turnips sliced and layered with cheese and spices), glazed carrots, applesauce, and pears or apples cooked in wine.

Feasts are not always limited to strictly period foods and recipes, but they rarely include glaringly non-period items such as hamburgers or corndogs (though there was at least one group which put on a feast in which they documented 'beans and weenies'). As with period feasts, there is often an elaborate main dish or dessert called a subtlety. (One group has a running gag at their annual feast in which the main dish is a mythical beast. To make a "sea dragon", for example, they assembled a 5-foot-long (1.5 m) meatloaf with a dozen chicken drumsticks arrayed along each side.)

Cooks who strive to stick to period recipes for their dishes make an effort to ensure that their menus are balanced to allow for modern palates, ingredients, and equipment, or to compensate for tight budgets or labor shortages.

A running joke in the SCA (and at least one song in very deliberate bad taste) concerns the supposed inedibility of feast food. On the contrary, SCA feasts are typically prepared by talented and capable volunteers who work long hours to prepare a good and filling meal—and usually at a cost of only a few dollars per person. Sometimes these amateur efforts even equal or surpass the quality of many expensive restaurants.

Those who work to prepare feasts are highly regarded, customarily being called into the dining area at the conclusion of the feast and thanked with thunderous applause, and many kingdoms provide for awards and titles to be granted to those who excel in this field.

=== Dance ===
Dance practices are held where Renaissance Dance and English Country Dance are taught in preparation for events and demos. There are also subsets within the SCA that practice and teach Middle Eastern (Egyptian Cabaret, Folkloric and American Tribal Style bellydance) and South Asian (Bharatanatyam, Kathak, Kuchipudi) styles of dance to be performed at events and around campfires.

=== Fiber arts ===
Many members, including men, enjoy practicing the arts of needlepoint, embroidery, cross-stitch, weaving, lace-making, quilting, kumihimo, spinning, nalbinding, sprang, braiding and dyeing. Period techniques are employed when possible, yielding intricately detailed and useful artwork which beautifies clothing and objects. Embroidery and cross-stitch in particular are often employed to create favors, given as gifts, tokens of affection or awards and often bear the arms or device of the person (usually a lady) giving the favor, or the arms of the SCA Order which the award is being bestowed (Pelican, Laurel, etc.).

=== Garb (costume) ===
The most basic requirement to attend an SCA event is that everyone must make a "reasonable attempt at pre-17th century clothing." Within the SCA, the term for this type of period clothing is "garb", and there can be a very wide range in the time period, style and level of authenticity. Many SCA members make their own clothing, but can also purchase their garb from merchants or barter with other SCA members. Newcomers to the SCA can usually borrow garb for their first event or two by contacting the local group's Gold Key officer or Chatelaine/Castellan, who is responsible for helping acclimatize new members.

=== Heraldry ===
The SCA maintains its own College of Arms to register and protect heraldic devices of its members (at least within the Society).

For the first three decades of the Society's existence, all heraldic device submissions had to be checked against extant SCA arms, heraldry taken from or alluding to works of fiction, and coats of arms granted to families alive or extinct. Following a major revision of the SCA's rules for heraldic submissions, SCA armorial bearings are now checked for conflict only against major coats of arms, devices and symbols that exist in the real world, and arms awarded within the Society itself.

Thus, while a person cannot register the Coat of Arms of Queen Elizabeth II or of France, for example, the SCA's College of Arms no longer checks for device conflicts with arms registered with the several European colleges of arms. In practical terms, the Modest Proposal rendered the Society as autonomous in matters of heraldry as the Colleges of Arms of various nations are in reality.

The Society's College of Arms also registers and maintains SCA names, checking against duplication and ensuring at least minimal period authenticity. In some cases, names that were once acceptable (for example, Fiona) have been shown to be of modern origin and are no longer allowed. Though bearers whose names were approved before such research are not required to change them, no new submissions with names the heralds have documented as having come into use outside the SCA's period will be accepted.

While there is no requirement to register a name and/or device, members are encouraged to do so. Newcomers are often counseled by experienced members on choosing a suitable persona name, and local heralds are usually enthusiastic about helping new members create and register a unique device that represents their personality and interests.

== Martial and combat ==
Fighters practising at Pennsic XXXVII (2009). Note the use of rattan swords and edge padding on the shields.

The SCA recreates three forms of martial activities, including "heavy" armoured combat, fencing and archery. Armoured combat focuses on recreating medieval tournament culture through courteous, chivalric displays of skill in practice, tournament and melee scenarios. SCA fencing employs a form of heavy rapier fencing built upon techniques outlined in German and Italian Renaissance era (15th-16th century) fencing manuals. Archery activities in the SCA include both target archery and combat archery, using equipment modified for safety in conjunction with armoured combat during melee scenarios. Those who demonstrate prowess in the martial arts may be nominated for awards at various levels, with the highest Society-wide awards being the Order of Chivalry (for heavy combat) and the Order of Defense (for rapier/fencing combat).

=== Archery ===
Combat Archery using bows and crossbows has been a part of Society combat since its early days, and currently is highly regulated for safety concerns. It is allowed only in war or melee scenarios. Strict rules are in place to limit the launch force of field weapons. Projectiles are specially built with large blunted tips and special backs to minimize the risk of true injury. Consistent with other SCA combat, arrow strikes to shields are considered blocked, while strikes to armored areas of the body are not. Judging the effects of blows is left to the honor of the combatant struck. Due to requirements of larger safety zones to protect spectators from ricochets and overshots, combat archery is usually limited to large melees.

For the purposes of combat, archers, although historically inaccurate, are nominally considered to be armored in the same basic fashion as heavy weapons combatants. They must be physically struck down to defeat them and they wear the same armor, with the exception of the hands, which be armored more lightly and flexibly to allow for the manual dexterity needed to fire. As always any combatant on the field may yield to their opponent in lieu of being hit. Thus, many combat archers who have no other way to defend themselves will therefore yield when charged by another Heavy Combatant, instead of taking a blow from which they cannot defend themselves.

In some kingdoms, archers who are properly authorized are permitted to carry melee weapons and to switch from bow/crossbow to the hand weapon. However they must properly retire their bow or crossbow before making the switch and meet safety requirements which protect any half-gauntleted hand (such as using a basket hilt).

Target Archery is a frequent activity within larger combat events, featuring archers competing to hit targets at varying distances and in varying formats. This form uses standard arrows with sharp heads, as opposed to the wide and flat heads which are safe for combat.

=== Armored combat ===
The Armored Combat or "Heavy Weapons Fighting" forms practiced in the SCA roughly mirror those of medieval infantry, and both tournaments and battles are fought. The fighters wear armor (often of their own making) made of plastic, leather, or steel, or any combination thereof.

As a full-contact sport; moves are not planned or signaled and fighters strike each other with considerable force and speed. Weapons are primarily made of rattan to resemble swords, pikes, spears, axes and other medieval weapon types. Maces and axes have heads made of rubber or stiff foam, and pole weapons (resembling medieval pole-axes, glaives, halberds or bills, etc.) may or may not be required to be similarly padded, depending upon the regulations in a given SCA kingdom.

For the purposes of calling blows, all heavy-weapons combatants are considered to be armored in a chain mail hauberk, with an open-faced helmet with a nasal. For that reason, a draw cut or glancing blow would have no effect, while a solid blow would. (Mail protects well against a slicing blade; it transmits most of the force of a blow.) Good strikes to the torso and head are treated as a 'killing blow'.

Most SCA fighters use a one-handed weapon in combination with a shield of some kind. With centuries of historical examples to draw upon, shields may range from large rectangular Roman-style scuta to small bucklers, with common styles including the "kite", center-grip (round or oval), and "heater" (so called because it resembles the shape of a flatiron). Other popular weapon choices include two-weapons (one in each hand) or two-handed weapons such as greatswords, glaives, or katana. Some Kingdoms are also starting to experiment with thrown weapons such as javelins and throwing axes for use in melees and battles.

Most groups hold "fighter practices" where individual and group combat is practiced and informal instruction occurs, but in some areas there may be more formalized and structured training in a local style. Typically several years of direct experience in the SCA's Armored Combat are needed to excel in tournaments.

=== Equestrian ===
The Equestrian Guilds promote the study, practice, demonstration, and teaching of equestrian-related activities in the Knowne World. The EQ Guilds encourage participation in games that are modeled on training techniques used by medieval armies, as well as a version of jousting.

At an equestrian event one may see riders competing in such games as:

- Rings, where the rider uses a lance to collect variously-sized rings from tall stands placed in a row;
- Heads, where the rider must weave through a line of poles that have "heads" placed atop, while attempting to knock the heads off with a padded (or "boffer") sword;
- Reeds, where the rider must ride in a straight line between poles that have reeds set atop them, while attempting to knock the reeds off the poles with a padded sword;
- The Quintain, where the rider uses a lance to strike a shield-shaped target mounted on a pole (to simulate striking an opponent in the Joust);
- Pig Sticking, where a rider attempts to put a spear into a target on the ground (not a real pig);
- Mounted Archery, where the rider must control his/her mount while shooting arrows at a target;
- Mounted Crest Combat, where two opponents, wearing steel helmets, "attack" each other with boffer swords, attempting to knock the crest off the other's helmet;
- Jousting. (Note, SCA Equestrian rules prohibit full-contact jousting at this time. Lances are constructed with breakaway foam tips, and riders must be able to easily release the lance if enough force is made upon contact with their opponent.)

Some of these games are designed to teach the rider to control his/her mount and weapon while in a combat situation. Others simulate hunting from horseback. Riders who wish to participate must demonstrate their ability to control a horse at various gaits, and control a horse while holding a weapon. Riders start at the Beginner level riding at a walk, and then advance through intermediate (trot) and advanced (canter or gallop) when they have proven their abilities to the Equestrian marshallate.

=== Fencing ===
SCA fencing rules differ substantially from Olympic fencing rules. Instead of fencing for points, fencers attempt to 'disable' or 'kill' their opponent by striking at target areas. Rapier combatants are considered to be wearing street clothes and leather gloves, so both thrusts and cuts are accepted as attacks. SCA rules do not recognize lanes or right of way. Opponents fight "in the round". Body-to-body contact is prohibited, but hand-on-blade contact is allowed, so the off hand becomes an important factor.

While many SCA members attempt to re-create rapier combat of the 16th and early 17th centuries, in practice it often becomes a blend of Society rules and modern fencing. Many rapier and smallsword enthusiasts study fencing manuals of the 15th and 16th centuries, and use rapier simulators made with schlaeger or bated rapier blades, rather than the more sport-oriented foil and épée blades. Some kingdoms are reviewing an experimental style called "side-sword", which allows percussive cuts and thrusts with blades suitable for cut-and-thrust style fencing.

Some fencing melees allow some firearm simulation (rubber band guns) as well. This activity is not universally accepted within the Society.

=== Siege combat ===
Siege Weapons are pieces of machinery on the battlefield. They are designed within guidelines to make sure that they cannot throw their ammo farther than 80 yards. Tt this level there is stored power in them and care and training is necessary to use them properly and safely.

=== Thrown weapons ===
Thrown weapons are used in melees when permitted. After the latest revision of the Marshal's Handbook basically any form of weapon can be made legal to be thrown. Essentially as long as the weapon weighs under 2 pounds, has every tip padded appropriately, and meets a few other guidelines, it is legal for being thrown. Also all thrown weapons can be used for striking or thrusting as well.

In addition, many kingdoms have competitions and awards for targeted thrown weapons such as axes and daggers.

=== Forbidden weapons and practices ===
Some weapons and combat practices, while actively used within the SCA's target period, have been barred from use because it is difficult or impossible to make them safe, or for stylistic reasons.

All martial combat in the SCA forbids grappling, wrestling, body-checking, kicking, or striking with the empty hand. It also forbids striking with a shield, weapon pommel or haft. In combat involving more than two fighters, striking another fighter from behind is also prohibited. In Armored Combat, punching weapons (such as Katar (कटार)), offensive shields such as the targe, and flexible weapons such as the flail are prohibited. In Rapier Combat, a cloak can be used as offhand defensive aid, but may not be thrown over an opponent's head to blind them.

Recreations of period firearms, no matter what the type of propulsion used, are banned from use on the Armored Combat field. This ban was put in place by the Board of Directors on January 16, 1999, on suggestion by the Society Earl Marshal at the time. The stated reason was that the appearance of firearms signaled the downfall of chivalric combat, which the SCA attempts to recreate, and therefore having said items on the field detracts from the experience. However, rapier combat still uses firearm and cannon simulators which fire loops of surgical tubing, much like a rubber band gun.

Sling weapons, including both the hand sling and staff sling, are banned for use in Armored Combat and in target competitions. While these were previously permitted, problems arose due to the sling's inaccuracy, including the possibility of a poor throw flying vertically or even backwards into spectators. There were also concerns of the string becoming accidentally entangled on other fighters if used in Armored Combat. However as of 2021 slings are being reconsidered for use in target shooting under the direction of thrown weapon marshals.

== Other ==
=== Guilds ===
In many kingdoms, members interested in various arts and sciences will band together to form guilds, much the same as medieval artisans and workers did, in order to preserve and disseminate knowledge, and to promote their crafts. Guilds run the gamut from loosely structured associations of people with a common interest, to official organizations sanctioned by Kingdom law and chartered by Society royalty. They cover activities and interests as diverse as baking, cartography, lacemaking, performing and dramatic arts, and survival skills/woodcraft. Guilds and associations also exist to promote various of the combat skills found within the SCA.

=== Chirurgeonate ===
The Chirurgeonate was a group of SCA members who volunteered to provide first aid at the various events. The chirurgeonate was abolished in 2015 due to concerns about legal liability.

=== Service ===
Without volunteers, no events within the Society would be possible. This activity runs the gamut from managing an enormous event such as Pennsic War, down to running local fight practices. Many members devote themselves, to a greater or lesser degree, to assisting in the smooth operation of events. Those who serve are also eligible for awards at the Kingdom and Baronial level, and the Society-wide award for service is the Order of the Pelican.

== Events ==
Events, which occur on rented sites, vary enormously, offering a wide variety of activities and are attended by garbed participants. SCA events are not typically spectator-oriented, so attendees are expected to follow SCA norms, including an attempt to dress in pre-17th century garb (clothing). This is one of the primary differences between SCA events and Renaissance Fairs.

Most events will normally finish with a Court to allow for the awarding of honors, and (in some areas) a feast. Evening activities can include bardic circles (formal and informal), medieval dancing, and post-revels (a party usually held at an individual's home).

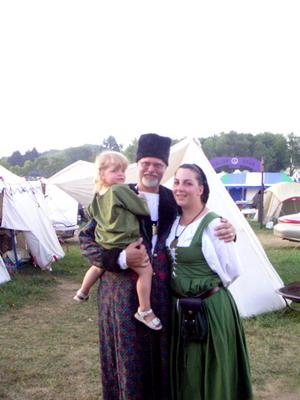
A family attending an SCA event

=== Arts and sciences ===
The SCA promotes the crafts, skills, and technologies practiced in the time period and cultures that the SCA covers. Arts and sciences range from the recipes used for a feast to the armor used in combat, the clothes and costumes that are worn to the bardic arts of singing, storytelling, poetry and instrumental pieces. An officer in the local group called the Minister of Arts and Sciences is usually in charge of promoting these crafts and aiding members in finding appropriate information. Other events are set up as a learning experience for the members. Typically, classes are given in history or crafts of the period, or in how to better perform activities within the SCA. Topics can range from heraldry, philosophy, and history to costuming, calligraphy, and metalwork. Some "A&S" events have competitions, with the largest offering overall prizes or championships in the arts.

=== Tournaments and wars ===
Combat events involve either tournaments with one-on-one SCA armored combat, or wars where teams compete against each other. Events focused on combat often have other activities happening at the same time.

Where a typical event may host anywhere from 20-800 participants over a weekend, the largest wars typically draw thousands from across the Society for up to two weeks. The longest and largest of these events is the Pennsic War—a two-week event in August catering to over 11,000 people participating in everything from combat to dance to history lessons. Combat at a war can involve forces numbering 100 to 3,000 participants on each side and can include safe versions of archery and siege engines. The largest event in Australia is the Rowany Festival.

Several combat-related activities happen independently at an event. Armored combat (swords, axes, etc.), fencing, and target archery may happen simultaneously on separate fields.

=== Coronations and investitures ===
These events center on the changing of the ceremonial leadership of sub-groups from the local barony up to the kingdoms. These events typically are more focused on ceremonial affairs, concentrating more on meetings and organization than combat or arts and sciences. As such, they are also more centered on the SCA's internal culture than on historical matters.

=== Demonstrations ===
Demonstrations or demos are intended for audiences and are put on by volunteers for a variety of purposes. Schools and community groups may request or be offered demos for education or entertainment. The SCA provides demonstrations of medieval arts and sciences, and members often teach beginner classes on the crafts and activities that can be learned. Combat demonstrations are usually of SCA-style combat using rattan weapons, although rapier combat is also demonstrated.

The Society has attempted, somewhat successfully, to become a more family-friendly environment since its founding. Demos provide an opportunity for interested people to get more information about participation in their local branch of the SCA.

=== Feasts and revels ===
Many SCA branches organize periodic feasts, with medieval food prepared by members for all attendees. Twelfth Night is a common feasting occasion.

=== Practices ===
As interest levels allow, SCA groups hold regular practices for a variety of activities. These tend to be unofficial and informal affairs where pre-17th century costume, while always welcome, is not required. Some practices are ostensibly for one activity but attract people interested not necessarily in the activity itself but more in socializing. A dance practice, for example, may draw the entire chapter together to 'hang out', while a small percentage actually dance. This serves to help integrate the group and prevent segmentation. These practices range from a variety of things from the various martial activities to the various arts and sciences. These practices serve a multitude of purposes. Often the most common practices in a group revolve around the arts and combat, and are organized by a group interested in a certain SCA activity under the auspices of a "guild." Common guilds include those for archery, brewing, cooking, dance, equestrian, fiber arts, period music, scribal arts, and smithing. In almost every group there is an associated officer that hosts these practices and serves as primarily a liaison between those willing to participate and those willing to teach. These practices are not exclusively held by an overseeing group; sometimes masters of their trade will hold regular practices to take on new students and to continue the education of old ones.
