= Crossroads (medieval village) =

Historical medieval-era focused communal site, established and run by a cooperative

Coordinates: 36°15′S 148°43′E

Crossroads was a medieval-era focused communal site in Australia, established and run by a cooperative. Its aim was to recreate a medieval European village on the site, and to establish co-operative style dwellings.

== History ==
The origins of the cooperative emerged in 1991 and by September 1992 the 26 foundation members of the project formed a non-profit co-operative. By 1994 enough funds had been raised through members and supporters to buy a good-sized block of land. Monthly working bees over the years built a small bridge, graded roads, camping sites and a dam. In addition to the work by the cooperative members, users of the land also added to the site with some improvements.

A medieval Guild Hall was built on site in 2006. This structure was based on mid 15th style architecture, with modifications for Australian conditions, based on availability of materials, and consideration of local fire hazards.

Apart from the Guild Hall, the site was developed with a residence for the site keeper. Some permaculture projects were undertaken on site after successful application for a government grant for these works.

The site was sold in 2018.

The Crossroads Medieval Village Co-Operative Limited was deregistered in the State of New South Wales on 22 June 2018.

== The Site ==
The site was 183 hectares, a third of which is forested, east of Yass, New South Wales, Australia.

== Events ==
The site for a number of years hosted the Rowany Festival a large medieval Festival held by the medieval living history group the Kingdom of Lochac, the Australian branch of the Society for Creative Anachronism (some members of whom were also involved in the Co-operative). This event saw upwards of 1,000 re-enactors on the site, over the Easter period. Other medieval events were held on site, including medieval food and wine themed events.

== Castle/Village Project ==
The Cooperative aimed to establish a small village, with a medieval theme and general appearance, but with some degree of modern comfort. The eventual goal of the cooperative was to build a full sized mid-15th-century-style village, inspired by the medieval French mountain village of Chalencon. This would have eventually included a castle, surrounded by typical buildings of a functioning medieval village. A wooden barn and the townspeople's homes would be built for the project, in addition to the buildings already on site. There was also a general aim to use the site as a general focal point for artisans interested in medieval arts and crafts. Cooperative members planned to live on site as a community.
