= Margaret Frazer =

American novelist

- Born: Gail Lynn Brown; November 26, 1946; Kewanee, Illinois, U.S.
- Died: February 4, 2013 (aged 66); Elk River, Minnesota, U.S.
- Occupation: Author
- Writing career
- Pen name: Margaret Frazer
- Genre: historical mystery
- Notable works: Sister Frevisse series, Player Joliffe series

Margaret Frazer, born Gail Lynn Brown (November 26, 1946 – February 4, 2013), was an American historical novelist, best known for more than twenty historical mystery novels and a variety of short stories. The pen name was originally shared by Frazer and Mary Monica Pulver Kuhfeld in their collaboration on The Novice's Tale, the first of the Sister Frevisse books featuring the Benedictine nun Dame Frevisse. Their collaboration came to an end with The Murderer's Tale, the sixth book in the series. Starting with the Edgar Award-nominated The Prioress' Tale, the Margaret Frazer pen name was used exclusively by Gail Brown. She also wrote the Player Joliffe mysteries, starring the medieval actor Joliffe.

Frazer was born and grew up in Kewanee, Illinois. An actress and member of the Society for Creative Anachronism, she lived and worked in Elk River, Minnesota. Frazer died on February 4, 2013, from breast cancer, aged 66.

== Overview ==
The first six Dame Frevisse mysteries were written as a collaborative effort between Frazer and Mary Monica Pulver Kuhfeld. The rest of the series was written by Margaret Frazer alone. Frevisse is a nun at the small, fictional, 15th-century Oxfordshire convent of St. Frideswide's, with its ten (more or less) nuns; the neighboring village of Prior Byfield belongs partly to the priory and partly to Lord Lovell (an historical figure). Six of the novels are set entirely at the priory and/or village; in others Frevisse leaves the convent, either to accompany another nun on some family or convent business or on business of her own. Many of the novels have the quality of "English village" murder mysteries, in which we see at close hand the everyday material life (and the intellectual and spiritual life) of various classes of people and observe the tensions within and between them; but here, the "everyday" is of the 15th century, carefully researched. Some of the later novels are primarily historical novels, in which Frevisse serves as an observer of the well-documented events and characters which brought on the Wars of the Roses, though there is always a murder for her to solve.

Dame Frevisse is related to Geoffrey Chaucer, author of the Canterbury Tales, by her aunt's marriage to Geoffrey's son, Thomas Chaucer. Titles of the Frevisse novels follow the format of Chaucer's Canterbury Tales, e.g., The Novice's Tale, The Prioress's Tale. There is no relation between Frazer's title characters and Chaucer's, even when they have the same role in life (e.g. Chaucer's Prioress is a dainty, sentimental woman while Frazer's is an ambitious, domineering one). However, there is the same implication that we are offered a variety of points of view. Each book begins with a chapter or passage focusing on the title character; this is followed by a change to Frevisse's perspective, which dominates the novel, though we return from time to time to the point of view of the title character. The role of the title character varies from book to book: murderer, victim, a person in power or a victim of others’ power. Seven of the title characters in the Dame Frevisse mysteries have been women.

The novels of the series are set from 1431 to 1452, during the reign of Henry VI of England; they overlap William Shakespeare's Henry VI, part 1 and Henry VI, part 2. They proceed in chronological sequence, and the heroine ages from a thirtyish nun in 1431 through the next twenty years. In the early novels, Frevisse's uncle (by marriage) Thomas Chaucer, son of the poet, provides a contact point with historical events as he brings news of the world to St. Frideswide's; at his funeral (The Bishop’s Tale), Frevisse establishes a relationship with her cousin Alice Chaucer, who is, in her third marriage, united to William de la Pole, count/marquis/duke (as the novels progress) of Suffolk, one of the most ambitious men around the king. In the same novel, Frevisse also impresses Bishop Beaufort, one of the most powerful men in the country. Out of these relationships come various missions in which Frevisse must assist Alice, Beaufort, or both in protecting various interests at the royal court. A character who occasionally appears is Joliffe, a man with a mysterious past.

Frazer's second set of mysteries, also set in 15th-century England, feature "Joliffe the Player", a spin-off character from the Dame Frevisse series, appearing first in The Servant's Tale and crossing paths with Frevisse again in The Prioress's Tale, The Bastard's Tale, and The Traitor's Tale. The Joliffe series is set in the mid-1430s; thus these novels sometimes feel like "prequels" to his appearances in Dame Frevisse novels set in a later decade.

The first three Joliffe novels present the life of an acting troupe traveling through the English countryside, with Lord Lovell as their patron after the end of the first novel. In the fourth, A Play of Lords, Joliffe is recruited as a spy for Bishop Beaufort and becomes involved in the political intrigues leading up to the Wars of the Roses. The fifth book, A Play of Treachery, takes him away from the players to France on behalf of Bishop Beaufort. When Joliffe again crosses paths with Dame Frevisse in The Traitor's Tale, he is employed as a spy for the Duke of York, after the death of Bishop Beaufort.

The sixth Joliffe mystery, A Play of Piety, is set in an English hospital where the actors' troupe has taken refuge. In this setting, strong personalities contend: women against the men who are supposedly in charge; a female medica or herbalist versus the male physician; and a toxic narcissist against everyone else. Playing the atypical role of a servant to the nursing sisters who run the hospital in open defiance of those who would dominate them, Joliffe solves the mystery.

Margaret Frazer was a Herodotus award winner, two-time Minnesota Book Awards nominee, and two-time Edgar award finalist.

== Bibliography ==
=== Dame Frevisse series ===
1. The Novice's Tale (1992)
2. The Servant's Tale (1993)
3. The Outlaw's Tale (1994)
4. The Bishop's Tale (1994)
5. The Boy's Tale (1995)
6. The Murderer's Tale (1996)
7. The Prioress' Tale (1997)
8. The Maiden's Tale (1998)
9. The Reeve's Tale (1999)
10. The Squire's Tale (2000)
11. The Clerk's Tale (2002)
12. The Bastard's Tale (2003)
13. The Hunter's Tale (2004)
14. The Widow's Tale (2005)
15. The Sempster's Tale (2006)
16. The Traitor's Tale (2007)
17. The Apostate's Tale (2008)

=== Joliffe series ===
1. A Play of Isaac (2004)
2. A Play of Dux Moraud (2005)
3. A Play of Knaves (2006)
4. A Play of Lords (2007)
5. A Play of Treachery (2009)
6. A Play of Piety (2010)
7. A Play of Heresy (2011)

=== Other novels and short stories ===
1. Neither Pity, Love, Nor Fear (1999)
2. Strange Gods, Strange Men (Nov 2003)
3. The Witch's Tale (1993)
4. The Simple Logic of It (2000)
5. The Midwife's Tale (1995)
6. Volo te Habere (2000)
7. A Traveller's Tale (2000)
8. This World's Eternity (2002)
9. That Same Pit (1998) (retitled Shakespeare's Mousetrap in 2010 for Kindle)
10. The Death of Kings (1997)
11. The Stone-Worker's Tale (2005)
12. Winter Heart (2011)
13. Heretical Murder (2001)
14. Lowly Death (2002)
15. Circle of Witches (2012)

=== Awards ===
The second in her Dame Frevisse series, The Servant's Tale received a nomination at the 1994 Edgar Awards in the "Best Paperback Original" category. The following year The Bishop's Tale received a "Best Novel" nomination at the 1995 Minnesota Book Awards convention. She was next nominated in 1998 with the novel The Prioress' Tale, again for the "Paperback Original" award at the Edgars. Her last novel to receive an award nomination was The Reeve's Tale which at the 2000 Minnesota Book Awards, again in the "Best Novel" category.

She also received the Herodotus Award for "Best Short Story Historical Mystery" in 2000 for her short story Neither Pity, Love, Nor Fear.
