= Kingdom of Lochac =

Society for Creative Anachronism Kingdom

The Kingdom of Lochac is one of twenty "Kingdoms" or regions of the Society for Creative Anachronism (SCA) - an international organization dedicated to researching and recreating aspects of the Middle Ages.

Comprising Australia, New Zealand and their Antarctic territories, it is made up of almost 40 local groups.

It is currently ruled by King Aonghus mac Griogair mhic Raghnaill and Queen Ginevra Lucia di Namoraza.

The kingdom takes its name from a Dutch term for Australia dating from 1630.

== General ==
The group has around 2000 members, and is one of Australia's oldest living history groups, having started in 1980. The Australasian branch includes Australia, New Zealand and Antarctica

== History ==
The SCA in Australia was initiated with a local SCA-inspired group, The Society for the Current Middle Ages (SCMA) holding its first event in November 1980. The Sydney-based SCMA joined the U.S.-based SCA in 1981. In New Zealand, an SCA-based group first appeared in Christchurch in 1982. Other cities in both countries formed groups, but the New Zealand groups became part of the Kingdom of Caid (based in Southern California), while Australia became the Crown Principality (and later the Principality) of Lochac under The West Kingdom. Lochac became a kingdom in its own right in 2002, and the New Zealand-based groups joined in 2003.

== Local groups ==
The different branches of the group are known within the group by their SCA names; for instance Parramatta in Sydney is known as Stowe-on-the-Wowlde, the Blue Mountains is known as the Shire of Dismal Fogs, and greater Sydney itself is the Barony of Rowany.

Other groups include:

- Barony of Aneala - Perth, Western Australia
- Barony of Ildhafn - Auckland, New Zealand
- Barony of Innilgard - South Australia and the Northern Territory.
- Barony of Krae Glas - South Eastern Melbourne, Victoria, Australia
- Barony of Mordenvale - Newcastle, New South Wales, Australia
- Barony of Politarchopolis - Canberra, ACT, Australia
- Barony of Riverhaven - North and Western parts of Brisbane, Queensland, Australia
- Barony of Rowany - Metropolitan Sydney and Western Country NSW, New South Wales, Australia
- Barony of St Florian de la Riviere - Brisbane South and Redland Shire Council, Queensland, Australia
- Barony of Southron Gaard - Christchurch, New Zealand
- Barony of Stormhold - Inner and west of Melbourne, Victoria, Australia
- Barony of Ynys Fawr - Tasmania, Australia
- Canton of Abertridwr - Part of Aneala
- Canton of Cairn Fell - Ballarat, Australia
- Canton of Cluain - Part of Ildhafn, New Zealand
- Canton of Stegby - Part of River Haven, Southern Darling Downs, Queensland, Australia
- Canton of Stowe on the Wowld - Part of Rowany, Australia
- College of Blessed Herman the Cripple - University of Adelaide the first of the Colleges registered in Lochac
- College of Saint Aldhelm - Australian National University
- College of Saint Andronicus - University of Canberra
- College of Saint Bartholomew - University of Melbourne
- College of Saint Basil the Great - University of Western Australia
- College of Saint Christina the Astonishing - Flinders University
- College of Saint Crispin - University of Newcastle
- College of Saint Gildas the Wise - University of Tasmania
- College of Saint Monica - Monash University
- College of Saint Ursula - University of Sydney
- Shire of Adora - Illawarra, New South Wales, Australia
- Shire of Boesenburg - Bunbury, Western Australia
- Shire of Darton - Wellington, New Zealand
- Shire of Dismal Fogs - Blue Mountains, New South Wales
- Shire of Dragons Bay - (Perth Southern Suburbs, Western Australia)x

== Awards ==
The society has a number of awards that are given to group members to encourage their skills in historical arts. Examples include:

- The Shining Helm - for armour
- The Order of the Pelican - for exceptional service and organisational skills
- The Order of Chivalry - for martial prowess and chivalry
- The Order of the Laurel - Exceptional skill as an artisan, in a specialised area
- The Order of Defence - for martial prowess and chivalry in rapier fencing

== Events ==
=== Rowany Festival ===
The group's largest event is the Rowany Festival, a week-long Medieval festival that features classes, tournaments, competitions and general revelry. It is held at Easter every year, near Sydney. Amongst SCAdians it is known as "Rowany", except those who live in the Rowany (Sydney) area, where it is known as Festival.

The Festival has been running since April 1983, is the longest running medieval/living history event in Australia. It has grown to its current size at which 1000 people may attend. It is the largest SCA event in Australia, and is a de facto "National event".

Some SCA members were involved in the Crossroads Medieval Village near Yass, New South Wales, and in the past the Rowany Festival has been held there.

As it is held over Easter, Christians generally get together to hold a scheduled Easter Sunday mass. And if Pesach falls at the same time of year, there are often people cooking in accordance with the very special customs that relate to that.

Traditionally large battles involving SCA Heavy Combat are fought at Rowany Festival that may include up to 300 combatants. Medieval feasts are held by the households participating. A "merchants row", a street of merchants, runs for the whole weekend, as well as a Saturday only market. Typically, the merchants sell arts, crafts and off the peg armour.

Rowany Festival has had five different locations. It was held from 1981 to 1997 at Fairholme Park in Wilton. It then moved to Tara Girl Guide camp in Silverdale in Western Sydney from 1998 to 2002, thence to the Crossroads Medieval Village medieval community in Yass. In 2008 it moved to the Glenworth Valley Horse Riding centre at Peats Ridge, New South Wales, and it has taken place at Camp Wombaroo near to Jellore State Forest since 2014.

There was no festival in 2020-21.

=== Other events ===
Other large, multi day event activities include Canterbury Faire held in New Zealand, "Great Northern War" held in Queensland, Spring War held in Newcastle, "Autumn Gathering" and "Pencampwr" held in Western Australia.

== See also ==
- Living History Australia
- Kingdom of Lochac - official website
