= SCA rapier combat =

Historical fencing style

Rapier combat is a style of historical fencing practiced in the Society for Creative Anachronism (SCA). The primary focus is to study, replicate and compete with styles of rapier sword-fighting found in Europe during the Renaissance period, using blunted steel swords and a variety of off-hand defensive items. Participants wear period clothing while competing, along with or incorporating protective equipment (such as modern fencing masks) for safety. In the April 2020 update of the rules, the sport was renamed 'Fencing Combat'.

== History ==
Since the founding day of the Society for Creative Anachronism (SCA), there was an interest in simulated combat sport with a "medieval style". The first "tournaments" were highly informal and used a mishmash of fencing equipment and wooden weapons. The first combat style among the SCA that evolved into a formal rule set from this was Armored Combat, which uses wooden, padded and rubber weapons along with specially made body armor unique to that style.

As early as 1969, there were informal discussions about introducing "rapier and dagger" style combat as a society activity. Several early rule sets using sport fencing-like systems were experimented with in the 1970s, with rules and activities being adopted in several kingdoms. In 1979 the Society Board of Directors formally approved the activity and approved the first set of rules.

Overall, the goal is distinct style within the organization focused more on the civilian dueling styles of the 14th, 15th and 16th century. Unlike the aforementioned armored combat, fencing in the SCA is closer to the modern sport fencing, using light body protection and flexible metal swords, though the rules are much less rigid. Since the time of its introduction, fencing has gained a significant following in the SCA, and having over one hundred competitors is not uncommon at larger event tournaments. The ultimate goal of SCA fencing as stated by the rules is to safely simulate fencing "with a real blade, extremely sharp on point and edge."

== Equipment ==
=== Weapons ===
A wide variety of blades and sword styles are permitted, but all fall into one of two classes: "Light rapier" and "heavy rapier." It is not permitted for the two classes of rapier to be used against each other; participants must all be using light or heavy. Light rapiers consist of commercially manufactured foil and épée, though the hilt and guard are sometimes replaced or altered to make them more closely resemble a historical sword. Heavy rapier are full-sized replicas of historical swords, with certain differences for safety reasons: The edges and tip must be blunt, with tips covered with a cap made of rubber, leather or plastic. Heavy rapier blades must pass a minimum flexibility test to be used.

In addition to strictly "rapier" hilt types, other period swords are permitted so long as the blade meets the aforementioned safety criteria. These include side-swords, two-handed swords such as longswords, and single-edged swords including Großes Messer, szablas, scimitars, and katanas.

Besides a primary sword, combatants are permitted to use an additional item in their off-hand. These include a parrying dagger (or main gauche), a shield or buckler, a cloak or other flexible item, a cane, stick, or baton, or even a second sword (known as wielding "a case of rapiers"). Nearly any item is permitted so long as it is durable, has no sharp edges and is not likely or designed to trap an opponent's sword in an unsafe manner. An empty off-hand may be employed to parry as well, but is vulnerable to normal thrusts and cuts from the opponent's weapon.

=== Protective Gear ===
Since the entire body is a potential target, a participant's entire body must be covered. No bare skin may show, and all clothing must be at least durable enough to not snag open or tear from light abrasions. Certain areas of the body must have stronger protection. For example, the front of the head, the neck and the top of the spine must be protected by rigid items. A modern, regulation fencing mask is the most common type due to their low cost and reliability, though some fencers wear steel helmets of a more historical design. The neck and top vertebrae are protected by a gorget made of heavy leather and/or steel. The torso and armpits must be covered with a heavy fabric of some sort or leather, that is sufficiently strong to resist puncturing if a blade were to break during a bout. Men are required to wear a protective cup, and women are encouraged to wear chest protection. Fencers must also make an attempt to approximate medieval or Renaissance dress. Popular outfits tend to be based on 14th to 16th century European clothing, but participants are free to design their outfit after any pre-1600 culture normally acceptable with the SCA, including styles of the Middle East, China and Japan. It is a popular tradition in the SCA for female fencers to dress in male attire (similar to La Maupin), though this is by no means a requirement.

== Competitions and rules ==
As fencing in the SCA is intended to be first and foremost fun, safety is the primary concern. All fencing practices and tournaments in the SCA are run by fencing "marshals" who are warranted to watch for unsafe behavior, inspect equipment, and "authorize" others to fence in tournaments (much like a referee). The "authorization" process includes a test of knowledge of fencing rules and bouts fought with previously authorized fencers under the marshal's supervision; the goal is not to prove the fencer's ability to win bouts, but his or her ability to participate safely and courteously in both tournaments and casual sparring. No fencers may compete in an SCA tournament until they have passed authorization, though they can participate in practice bouts until that time.

Unlike modern fencing, SCA fencing has no restrictions or divisions based on gender.

=== List field ===
SCA fencing is conducted in an open space permitting sideways movement, rather than back and forth on a linear strip as in conventional sport fencing. The fencers may move freely within a designated fighting space called the "list field". These fields may be any size and are often outdoors. Bouts are observed by one or more marshals, who monitor the fencers for safety as well advising when a fencer is too close to the boundaries of the field. There is no penalty for accidentally bumping into or backing over a boundary; it most often results in the match being halted temporarily for the combatants to re-position.

=== Valid attacks ===
The entire body is considered a valid target, and there is no "priority" (right-of-way) rule, which is similar to sport Épée.

A valid blow is scored with either a thrust in line with the blade or a cut with the edge of the blade. In normal rapier rules, the edge may only be used for draw-cuts (placing the blade and pulling or pushing it on the opponent's body), while under "cut and thrust rapier" rules, percussive blows with the edge are also permitted. Only a sword or dagger may be used to strike an opponent. Participants cannot punch, kick, grab, body check or otherwise make physical contact with their opponent's body (beyond unintended fleeting contact), and may not strike an opponent with a shield, cloak, stick or any other parrying device.

The scoring of a blow is based on an honor system; it is the responsibility of the fencer being hit to acknowledge a valid attack from the opponent. The fencer who is struck verbally acknowledges the blow by calling out in a loud voice, or in certain types of combat, dramatically acting out the hit for showmanship. No fencing directors, judges or electronic scoring systems are used. The fighting is overseen by a marshal who monitors the bout for safety and fair play from both participants, but is not permitted to judge the validity of an attack. However, the marshal has the ability to warn a fighter in cases where an obvious blow went unacknowledged, usually by politely asking if they are certain they were not struck. In extremely rare cases, the fighter's authorization to fence can be revoked.

Bouts usually continue until one fighter is struck by an "incapacitating" blow or otherwise becomes disinclined to continue. A fighter may also yield (concede victory to the opponent) at any time during the bout. An "incapacitating" blow is defined as a valid attack to the head, neck, torso, armpit or inner groin area. Attacks to the legs or arms are considered "disabling". A hit to the arm disables that arm, which is held behind the fencer's back or hanging limply at their side. Fencers whose sword arm is disabled can switch hands. Some kingdoms use rules with additional details for strikes to the hand, which may simply disable the hand (represented by making a fist) or apply to the whole arm. For a strike to the leg or foot, the fencer can continue fighting but must kneel, sit on the ground, or balance on one leg. Under Cut and Thrust rules, hits to the leg or foot are considered incapacitating. Many kingdoms contain additional clarifications of these rules, such as only permitting sitting on the ground when the leg is hit, and/or limiting the permitted angle of approach for the opponent while seated (to avoid unsafe strikes to the back).

Bouts can be one-on-one, or a "mêlée" where more than two fencers are involved. Melees can involve teams of fencers that must work as a group, or an every-man-for-himself "grand mêlée". One important matter of safety in a mêlée is attacking an unaware fencer from behind. Normally this is not permitted unless it is announced before that particular match. When allowed, the attacking fencer must not slash or stab an opponent who doesn't know they are there, but rather must lay their blade on his or her shoulder so the tip is visible to the opponent and verbally tell them they have been "killed" in a loud voice.

=== Tournaments ===
SCA tournaments are usually conducted in rounds with winners of each round advancing towards the finals.

Some common tournament formats are:

- Single or double elimination
- Swiss five
- Passe de Armes
- Scenarios (including group combat, terrain, obstacles, and more)

=== Mêlées ===
Mêlées between groups of fencers often take place at SCA events; these can be merely mock-brawls between disorganized "factions," but sophisticated small unit tactics are often seen. At Pennsic or the Gulf War it is not unknown for more than two hundred fencers to take the field for a "battle".

The SCA also allows simulations of period firearms to be used under certain conditions in fencing mêlées.

These simulations fire large "rubber bands" made of surgical tubing looped around and securely joined. "Wheel lock" pistols are most common, but muskets are not unknown.

This ammunition has enough mass to allow the target to feel its impact through fencing armor, but is light enough to prevent injury. Some SCA fencers have even built light cannon firing as many as fourteen rubber bands at a single shot, thus simulating the effects of grape shot.

== Fencing titles and awards ==
There are many different awards for fencing within the Society.

=== Interkingdom awards ===
- The Order of the Laurel - Some fencers have been elevated to the Order of the Laurel for research and historical fencing technique.
- The Order of Defense - Created in 2015, the Order of Defense is a full Peerage-level award, equivalent to knighthood in the SCA, and is the highest honor a fencer can receive for rapier combat. Individuals receiving this award are allowed to wear a white livery collar and a heraldic badge consisting of three rapiers with crossed blades.
- The Order of the White Scarf - The various Orders of the White Scarf are kingdom orders recognizing excellence in SCA fencing. These orders are almost all signatory to a treaty giving permission to any other kingdom to use the name "White Scarf", which is registered with the SCA College of Arms. The treaty also includes an agreement by the signatory kingdoms to treat visiting members of other White Scarf orders as they treat their own White Scarves. Many people mistakenly think of the collection of these orders as an interkingdom order. There are kingdom Orders of the White Scarf in 13 out of the 20 different kingdoms. More information is at: http://cunnan.sca.org.au/wiki/White_Scarf and at Moondragon Manor Online.

=== Kingdom awards ===
- The Order of the Golden Rapier is the East Kingdom order for excellence in rapier combat.
- The Company of the Bronze Ring is the Midrealm order for fencing skill.
- The Meridian Order of the Blade is the Meridies order for fencing skill.
- The Order of the Queen's Blade is the Gleann Abhann order for fencing skill.
- The Order of The Dragon's Steel is given in the Kingdom of Drachenwald to those who display superior abilities in light weaponry. It carries with it a grant of arms. Before creating a new member of the Order, the Crown must consult with the Order.
- The Stile Fryd and Stile Huscarl are Calontir's awards for skill in cut and thrust. They carry an award or grant of arms, respectively.
- Ordo Circini Vitruvii. After the creation of the Order of Defence, the Northshield Order of the White Scarf was closed and the grant-level Ordo Circini Vitruvii created.

== Historical fencing and the SCA ==
Along with their practice of fencing, many SCA fencers also study period fencing manuals such as those by Ridolfo Capo Ferro, Giacomo di Grassi, Camillo Agrippa, and Carranza. While study and use of period technique is far from universal, with the increased popularity of accurate rapier simulators (as opposed to foils and épées) as well as Cut and Thrust rules, participants are able to apply a large variety of period techniques in competition as well as being able to study it in a collaborative, non-competitive setting.

== Criticism ==
Some fencers argue that draw cuts are not martially sound techniques and make cutting a due tempi ("double time") action, whereas a percussive cutting action would be in stesso tempo ("single time"). A counter-argument to this is that the slender, light blade of the rapier is a poor "chopping" blade and in period was often not particularly sharp. A drawing cut was far more effective for inflicting a serious wound. With the addition of the Cut & Thrust style and rules, this criticism no longer applies.

== See also ==
- SCA Heavy Combat
- Pennsic War
