= Mary Monica Pulver Kuhfeld =

American novelist

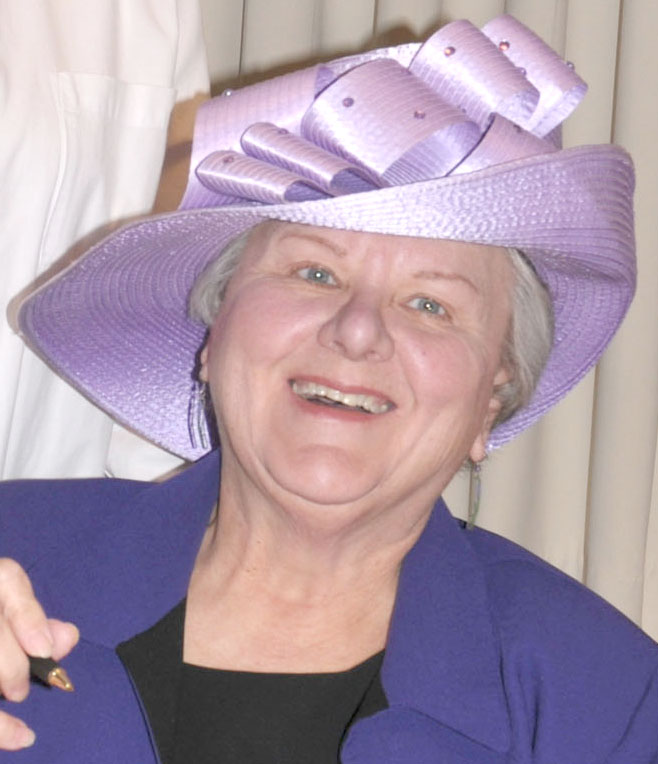
Monica Ferris at a 2012 book signing.

Prolific author of several series of mysteries as Monica Ferris, Mary Monica Pulver, Margaret Frazer, Ellen and Mary Kuhfeld. The latest in Monica Ferris' Needlecraft Mysteries, "Knit Your Own Murder", was published in 2016.

== Bibliography ==
Monica Ferris:

- Crewel World - 1999
- Framed in Lace - 1999
- A Stitch in Time - 2000
- Unraveled Sleeve - 2001
- A Murderous Yarn - 2002
- Hanging by a Thread - 2003
- Cutwork - 2003
- Crewel Yule - 2004
- Embroidered Truths - 2005
- Sins and Needles - 2006
- Knitting Bones - 2007
- Thai Die - 2008
- Blackwork - 2009
- Buttons and Bones - 2010
- Threadbare - 2011
- And Then You Dye - 2012
- The Drowning Spool - 2014
- Darned If You Do - 2015
- Knit Your Own Murder - 2016
- Patterns of Murder: Crewel World/Framed in Lace/A Stitch in Time - 2005 (omnibus)
- Sew Far, So Good: Unraveled Sleeve/A Murderous Yarn/Hanging by a Thread - 2009 (omnibus)

Mary Monica Pulver:

- Murder At The War - 1987
- The Unforgiving Minutes - 1988
- Ashes to Ashes - 1988
- Original Sin - 1991
- Show Stopper - 1992

Margaret of Shaftesbury:

- The Chronicles of Deer Abbey - 2017

Ellen and Mary Kuhfeld:

- Minnesota Vice -2017
