= Chalencon =

- Commune
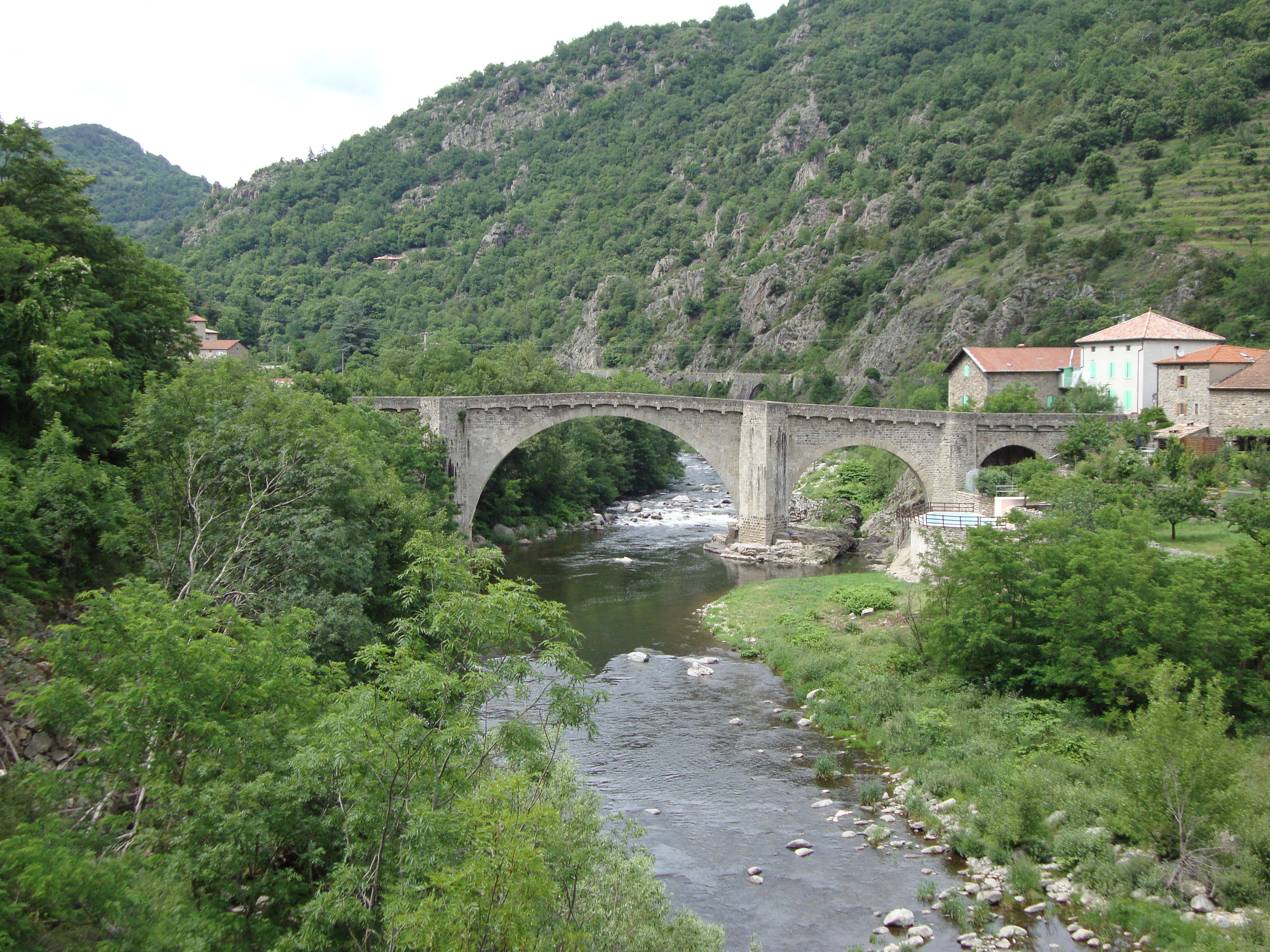
- Chervil bridge

- Coat of arms
- Location of Chalencon
- Location within France Location within Auvergne-Rhône-Alpes
- Coordinates: 44°52′42″N 4°34′31″E
- Country: France
- Region: Auvergne-Rhône-Alpes
- Department: Ardèche
- Arrondissement: Privas
- Canton: Haut-Eyrieux
- Intercommunality: CA Privas Centre Ardèche

Government
  - Mayor (2020–2026): Alain Sallier
- Area^{1}: 9.44 km^{2} (3.64 sq mi)
- Elevation: 657 m (2,156 ft)
- Highest elevation: 867 m (2,844 ft)
- Lowest elevation: 259 m (850 ft)
- Population (2023): 328
  - Density: 34.7/km^{2} (90.0/sq mi)
- Time zone: UTC+01:00 (CET)
  - Summer (DST): UTC+02:00 (CEST)
- INSEE/Postal code: 07048 /07240
- ^{1} French Land Register data, which excludes lakes, ponds, glaciers > 1 km^{2} (0.386 sq mi or 247 acres) and river estuaries.

Chalencon is a commune in the Ardèche department in southern France. Located about 30 kilometers west of the river Rhône on the north side of the Eyrieux river gorge. The historic village of Chalencon is at an elevation around 700 meters. Chalencon was a trading center and a center of justice in ancient times. Chalencon had a fortified chateau with a large walled compound on the hilltop overlooking the town. This complex vanished long ago and was used as a source of stone for construction in the town. The town itself had an inner and outer city walls parts of which still exist. The "Place du Valla" located in front of the entrance gate to the older inner city was originally a dry moat but now is a greenspace with beautiful views of the Mont Mezenc, an ancient inactive volcano and down into the gorge.

== Population ==
Historical population
Year	Pop.	±% p.a.
1968	474	—
1975	314	−5.71%
1982	320	+0.27%
1990	309	−0.44%
1999	303	−0.22%
2007	308	+0.20%
2012	310	+0.13%
2017	311	+0.06%
2023	328	+0.89%
Source: INSEE

== See also ==
- Communes of the Ardèche department
