= SCA armoured combat =

Combat sport

Fighters practicing at Pennsic XXXVIII (2009). Note the use of rattan swords, edge padding on the shields, and bar grills added to the helmets

SCA armoured combat, or informally heavy combat, is a combat sport developed by the Society for Creative Anachronism (SCA) in which participants in protective body armour compete in mock combat, individual tournaments inspired by forms of historical combat, and tournament combat practiced in medieval Europe. Groups also compete, under supervision, in group battles which may approximate historically real combat, using SCA approved safe weapons. Combats are performed under the watch of marshals to maintain safety. It is variously considered a combat sport, contact sport, or a form of martial art.

The slang term "heavy" is used to distinguish this from "light" combat, now almost exclusively referred to as rapier combat.

Participants use armour and weapons specified by SCA standards and rules. Weapons are made from rattan rather than steel for added safety. All major vital points of the body must be covered by armour. The fighting is a full-speed, near full-force, full-contact competition between two or more combatants, designed to resemble medieval combat dueling or melees of up to 2000 participants.

While SCA heavy combat is relatively new compared to other more established martial activities, with the first tournaments held in 1966, it has now evolved into a large worldwide combat form with thousands of active participants in Poland, Canada, the United States, Germany, Austria, Finland, Netherlands, Ireland, United Kingdom, Iceland, Japan Spain, Belgium, Thailand, Sweden, South Africa, Australia and New Zealand with new groups in Russia, Italy and China.

== Weaponry ==
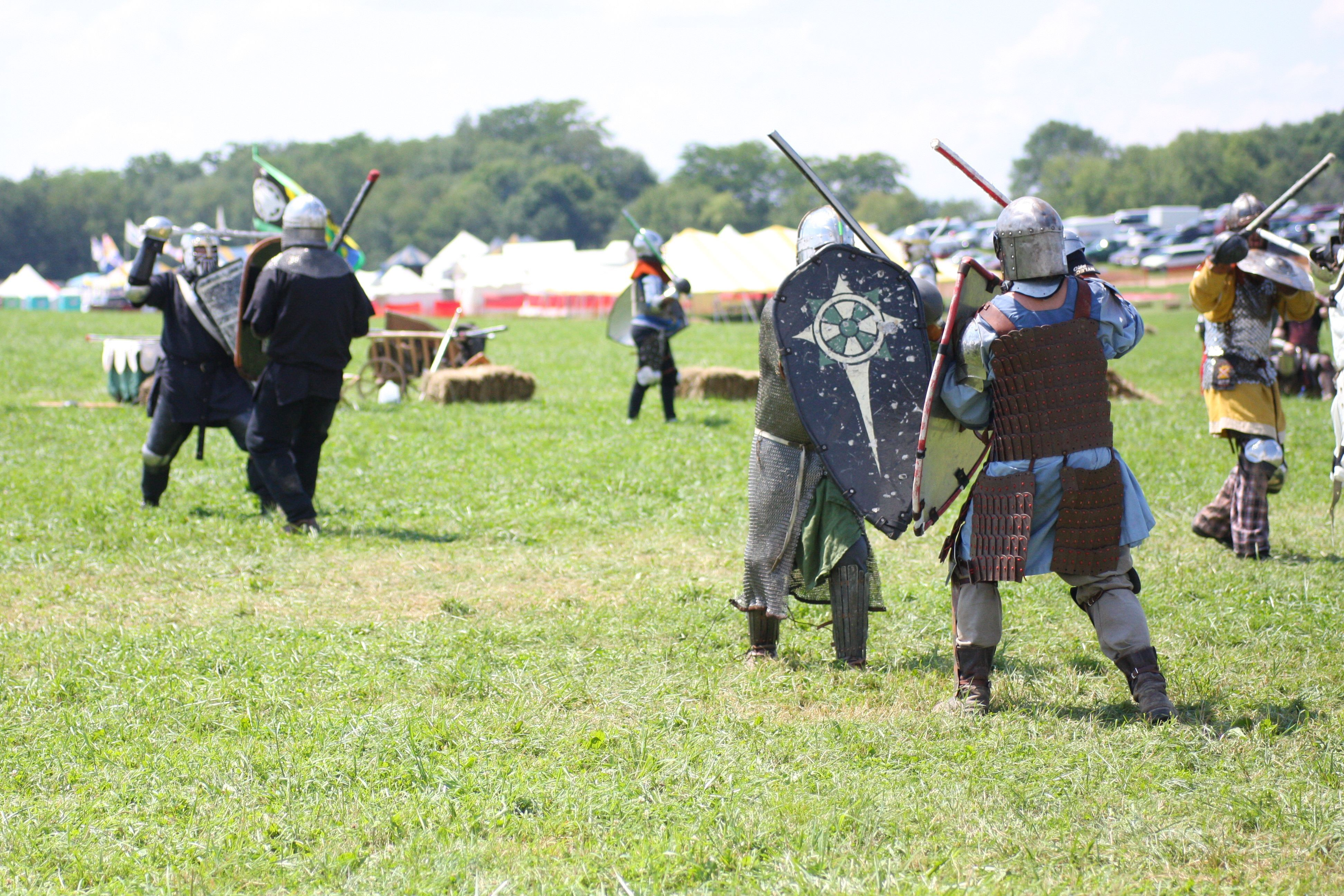
Fighters practising at Pennsic XXXVIII (2009)

Participants may choose a wide range of weapons. Rattan is used for most striking weapons, staffs, poles, and handles because when damaged it forms flexible fibers rather than dangerous sharp splinters. Leather, foam, and duct tape may also be used in their construction. Non-striking surfaces (such as quillons and basket hilts) may be made of rigid materials like metal, rubber, or plastic.

== Armour ==
All armour standards are codified, with slight variations between the different regional groups within the SCA. All vital points are covered by some hard rigid protection. Safety standards are high and generally well enforced, with few serious injuries in comparison to other sports. Steel is generally used for armour (though aluminum, leather and even plastic or carpet may be used if they are covered over). There are a number of armourers that supply the SCA and other living history groups, but many make their own armour, while some participants may import armour from overseas. Armour is generally encouraged to look like its historical counterpart, though differences are often necessary to comply with safety requirements, and sometimes modern sport armour may be used One of the most common examples is the face of a helmet: While many types of historical helm had no face protection, safety rules require full coverage of the head. As a result, there are many variations of helm used in the SCA that are otherwise historically accurate but have a steel grill added to cover the face. These grilled faceplates were also used for tournaments in Europe in the 14th and 15th Centuries, although probably not for actual warfare. Armour costs can vary greatly from DIY, donation, used armour, or spending up to thousands for museum quality armour, and may weigh as much as 70 pounds.

== Rules ==
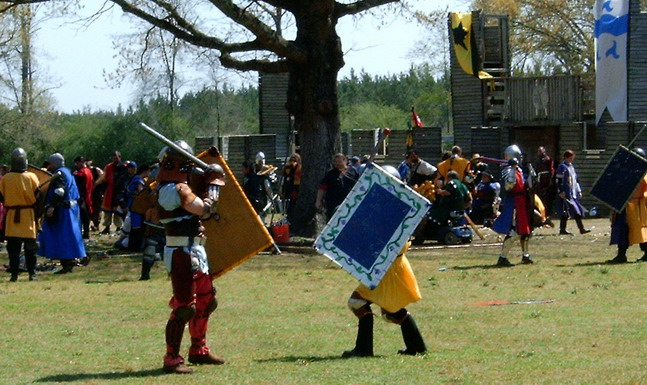
Fighters practicing at Gulf Wars XIII (2004)

In SCA heavy combat, the validity of a blow received is judged on an honour system. The combatant receiving a blow from a SCA-approved weapon judges if they would have been uninjured, injured, or killed had it been a historically real weapon impacting a universal "imaginary" set of SCA specified armour that all combatants "wear". This set of default armour balances valid blow/hit levels and helps to eliminate differences created by the armour combatants are actually wearing. This "imaginary" armour set consists of mail hauberk, an open-faced helmet with a nasal (nose protection), and boiled leather armour about the arms and legs. Blows with sufficient force are judged by combatants to have been deflected, defeated, or penetrated this style of armour, or if struck on an "unprotected" area of the body. Depending on these several variables a combatant judges the level of damage ranging from no damage to instant death and responds according to SCA norms and rules. Combatants varying from SCA combat norms and rules are normally frowned upon because they could potentially compromise safety, fun, and reflect badly on the honor of SCA combatants.

The effect a blow has on a combatant is determined by a body part target location system. If the head, neck or torso are hit with significant force, the combatant is deemed dead. If a leg is hit with significant force to disable it, the combatant must fight on their knees thereafter. If an arm is hit, the combatant can no longer use it to hold a weapon or shield. Different weapons can have different effects, simulating the effect of the period weapon (e.g. a mace hit upon the shoulder has a more severe effect than a sword, to simulate the effect of the mace as a heavier weapon). The struck combatant either verbally acknowledges the validity of a blow or acts it out, depending on the type of bout. Some bouts request a defeated combatant die a dramatic death for good showmanship.

Certain combat moves and styles are prohibited for safety reasons; even if they would have occurred in real historical combat because they could present major safety issues for modern SCA practitioners.

Grades, in the form of Knighthoods, are awarded to those of sufficient prowess. Women are awarded knighthoods as well.

== Competitions ==
SCA tournaments are held regularly in which two combatants fight each other, using a number of advancement systems so that a single winning fighter is decided. A special case of this is the regular Crown Tournament in each SCA kingdom held to choose the king and queen who will "rule".

Melee tournaments can include a number of combatants taking to the field. Especially at large events such as Pennsic War, combats may include wars, where large number of participants can take the field at once, and these may include archers, artillery and fortifications. Sometimes, novelty combat may occur, where for instance, the fighters take the form of chess pieces.

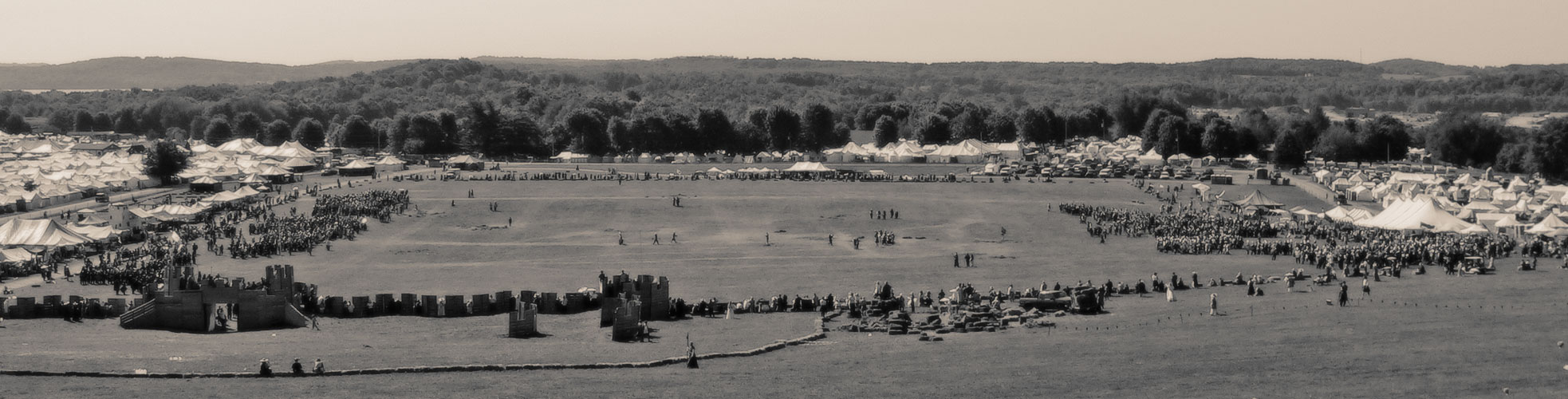
Pennsic field battle in 2006

== Training ==
Most local SCA groups hold "fighter practices" where individual and group combat is practiced and informal instruction occurs, but in some regions there may be more formalized and structured training in a local style. Typically several years of direct experience in heavy combat are needed to excel in tournaments. Experienced fighters often train less-experienced fighters in a Knight / squire relationship.

== Fighting styles ==
Unlike many other martial arts, there is no general formal style or codified system within SCA heavy combat, and individuals may fight whatever style and type of weapon that are permissible within the rules. Styles and strategies are often passed on within local groups based on either the individual style of a local trainer, who is normally an experienced fighter known as a "Knight" or a "Peer", the style of the local group as a whole, or the style of a particular household.

== See also ==
- SCA Rapier Combat
- Society for Creative Anachronism activities
- Historical European martial arts
- Armored combat (sport)
