= Society for Creative Anachronism =

International living history group

- Founded: May 1, 1966; 60 years ago in Berkeley, California, U.S.
- Type: 501(c)(3) non-profit corporation
- Purpose: Historical reenactment
- Headquarters: Milpitas, California
- Coordinates: 37°23′45″N 121°56′15″W
- Region served: Worldwide
- Volunteers: About 30,000
- Website: www.sca.org

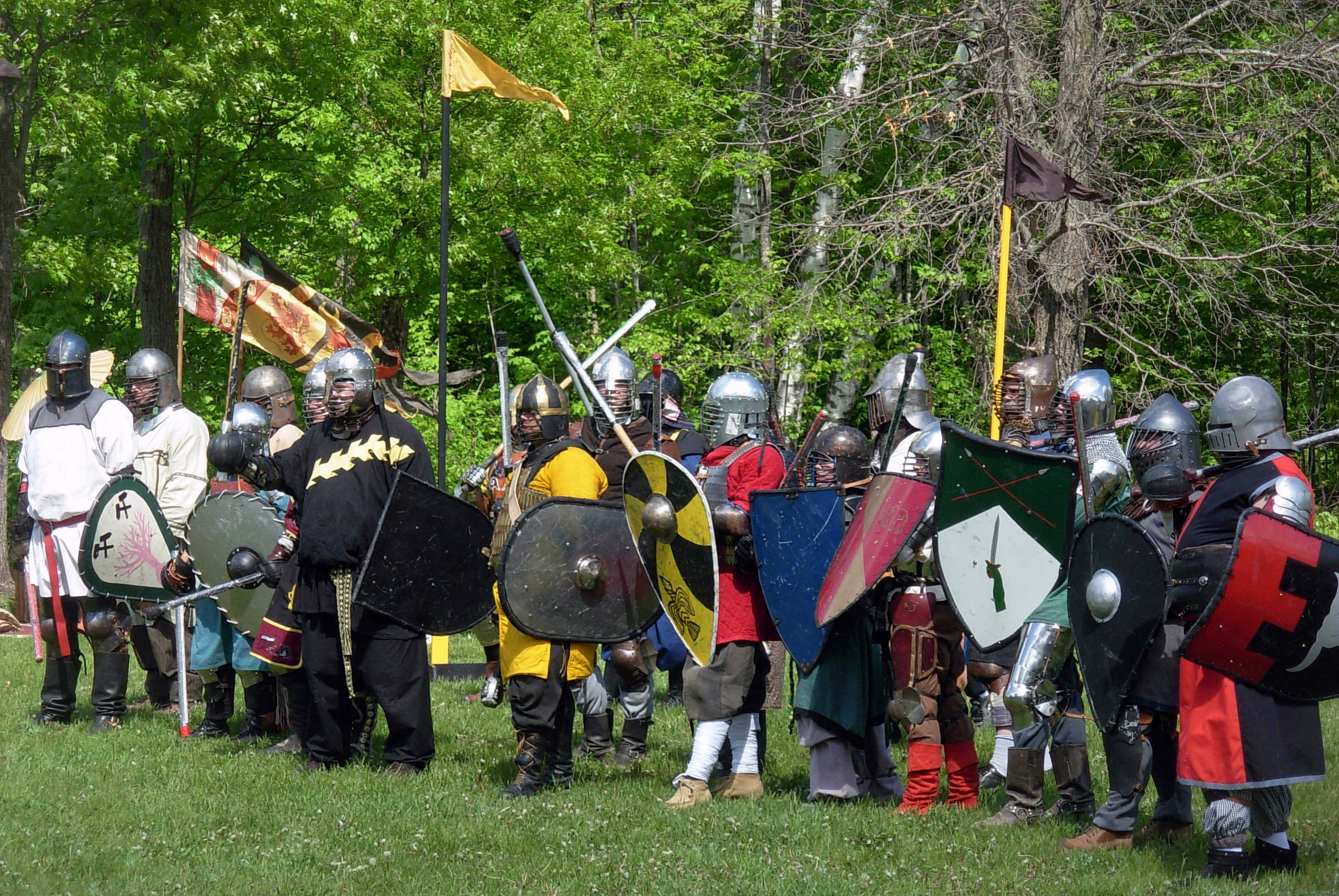
Society for Creative Anachronism armored combat participants

The Society for Creative Anachronism (SCA) is an international living history group with the aim of studying and recreating mainly Medieval European cultures and their histories before the 17th century. A quip often used within the SCA describes it as a group devoted to the Middle Ages "as they ought to have been", choosing to "selectively recreate the culture, choosing elements of the culture that interest and attract us". Founded in 1966, the non-profit educational corporation has over 20,000 paid members as of 2020 with about 60,000 participants in the society, including members and non-member participants.

== History ==
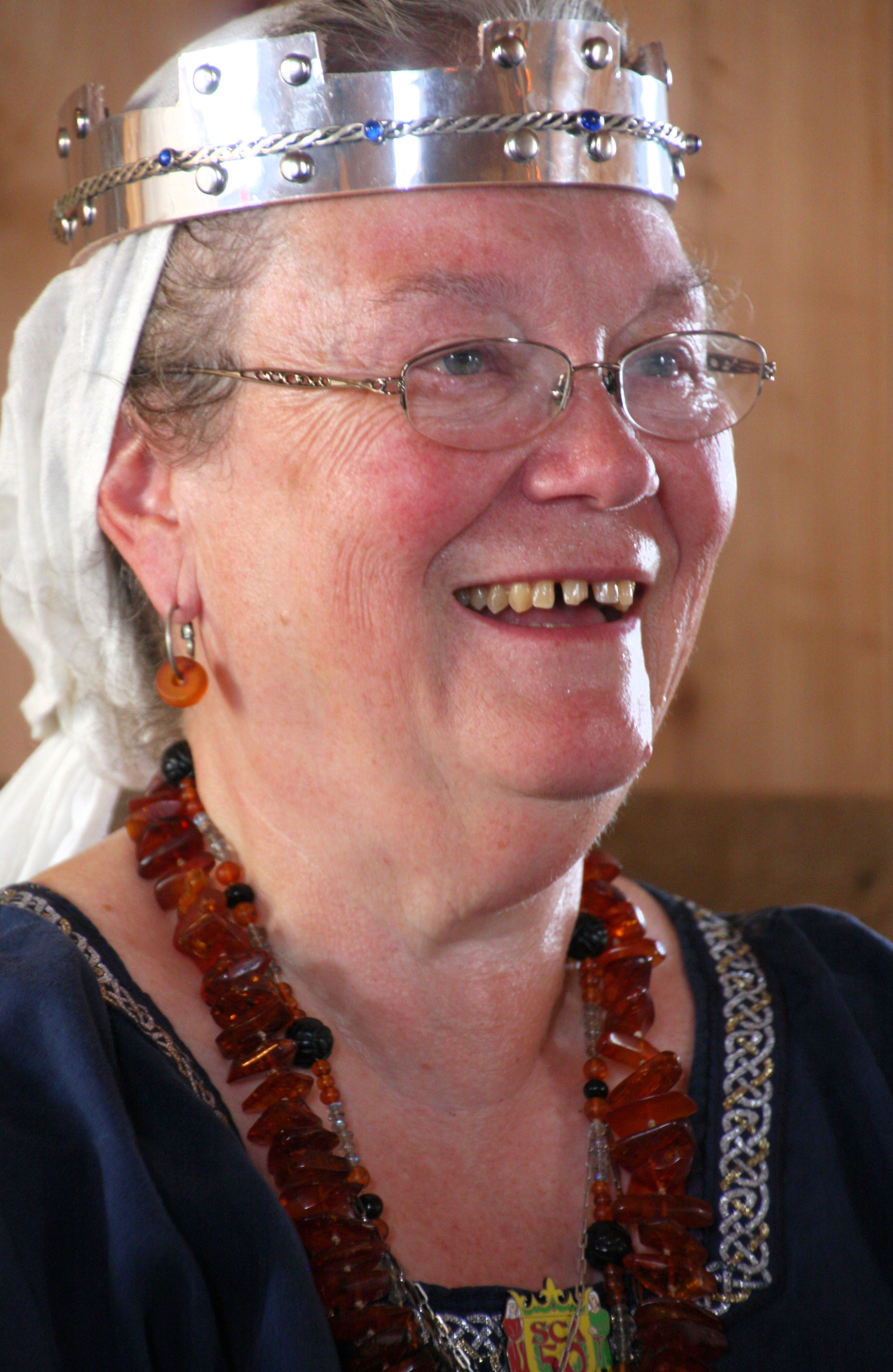
Author Diana Paxson celebrating the 50th anniversary of the SCA in 2016

The SCA's roots can be traced to a backyard party of a UC Berkeley medieval studies graduate, the author Diana Paxson, in Berkeley, California, on May Day in 1966. The party began with a "Grand Tournament" in which the participants wore helmets, fencing masks, and usually some semblance of a costume, and sparred with each other using weapons such as plywood swords, padded maces, and fencing foils. It ended with a parade down Telegraph Avenue with everyone singing "Greensleeves". The SCA still measures dates within the society from the date of that party, calling the system Anno Societatis (Latin for "in the Year of the Society"). For example, 2009 May 1 to 2010 April 30 was A.S. XLIV (44). The name Berkeley Society for Creative Anachronism was coined by science fiction author Marion Zimmer Bradley, an early participant, when the nascent group needed an official name in order to reserve a park for a tournament. "Berkeley" was dropped as the group expanded. Three other co-founders were science fiction author Poul Anderson, his wife, writer Karen Kruse Anderson, and their daughter, Astrid.

In 1968, Bradley and her husband Walter Breen moved to Staten Island, New York where they co-founded the Kingdom of the East, holding a tournament that summer to determine the first Eastern King of the SCA. That September, a tournament was held at the 26th World Science Fiction Convention, which was in Berkeley that year. The SCA had produced a book for the convention called A Handbook for the Current Middle Ages, which was a how-to book for people wanting to start their own SCA chapters. Convention goers purchased the book and the idea spread. Soon, other local chapters began to form. In October 1968, the SCA was incorporated as a 501(c)(3) non-profit corporation in California. By the end of 1969, the SCA's three original kingdoms had been established: West Kingdom, East, and Middle. All SCA kingdoms trace their roots to these original three. The number of SCA kingdoms has continued to grow by the expansion and division of existing kingdoms; for example, the kingdoms now called the Outlands, Artemisia, Ansteorra, Gleann Abhann, Meridies, and Trimaris all are made up of lands originally belonging to the fourth kingdom, Atenveldt, which began as a branch of the West Kingdom.

== Activities ==
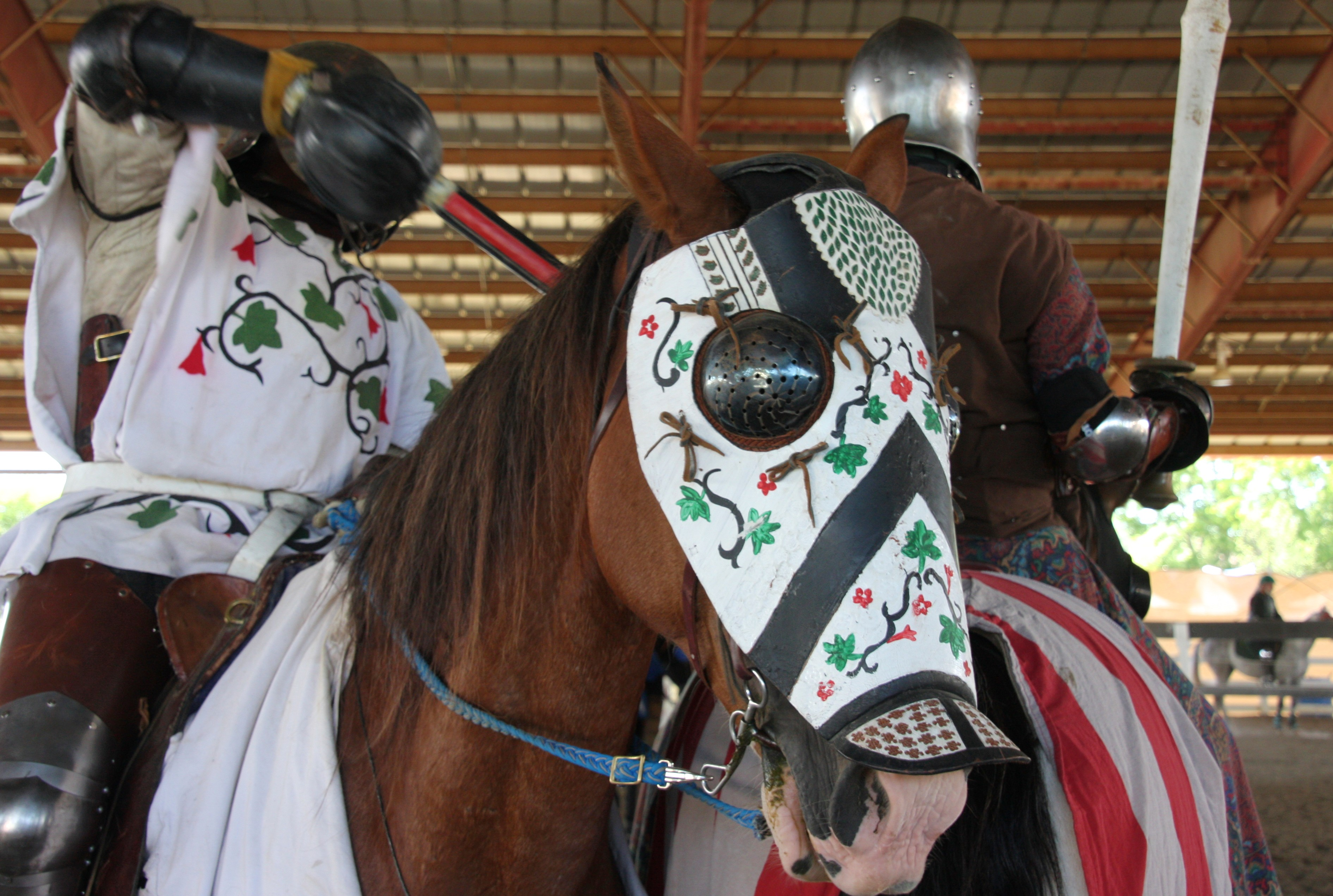
Equestrian combat in the SCA

The SCA engages in a broad range of activities, including SCA armoured combat, SCA fencing, archery, equestrian activities, feasting, medieval dance, and recreating medieval arts and sciences, including a broad range of crafts and medieval music and theatre. Other activities include the study and practice of heraldry and scribal arts (calligraphy and illumination). Members are afforded opportunities to register a medieval personal name and coat of arms (often colloquially called a "device" in SCA parlance). SCA scribes produce illuminated scrolls to be given by SCA royalty as awards for various achievements.

Most local groups in the SCA hold weekly fighter practices, and many also hold regular archery practices, dance practices, A&S (Arts & Science) nights and other regular gatherings. Some kingdoms and regions also have occasional war practices, where fighters practice formations and group tactics in preparation for large scale "war" events.

The research and approach by members of the SCA toward the recreation of history has led to new discoveries about medieval life. The SCA does not require participants to wear historically accurate clothing or equipment. According to the newcomer's guide:

We request that all participants make "an attempt" at pre-17th-century clothing commonly referred to as "Garb"...As you pick items, always remember to try not to make them "obtrusively modern".

=== Events ===
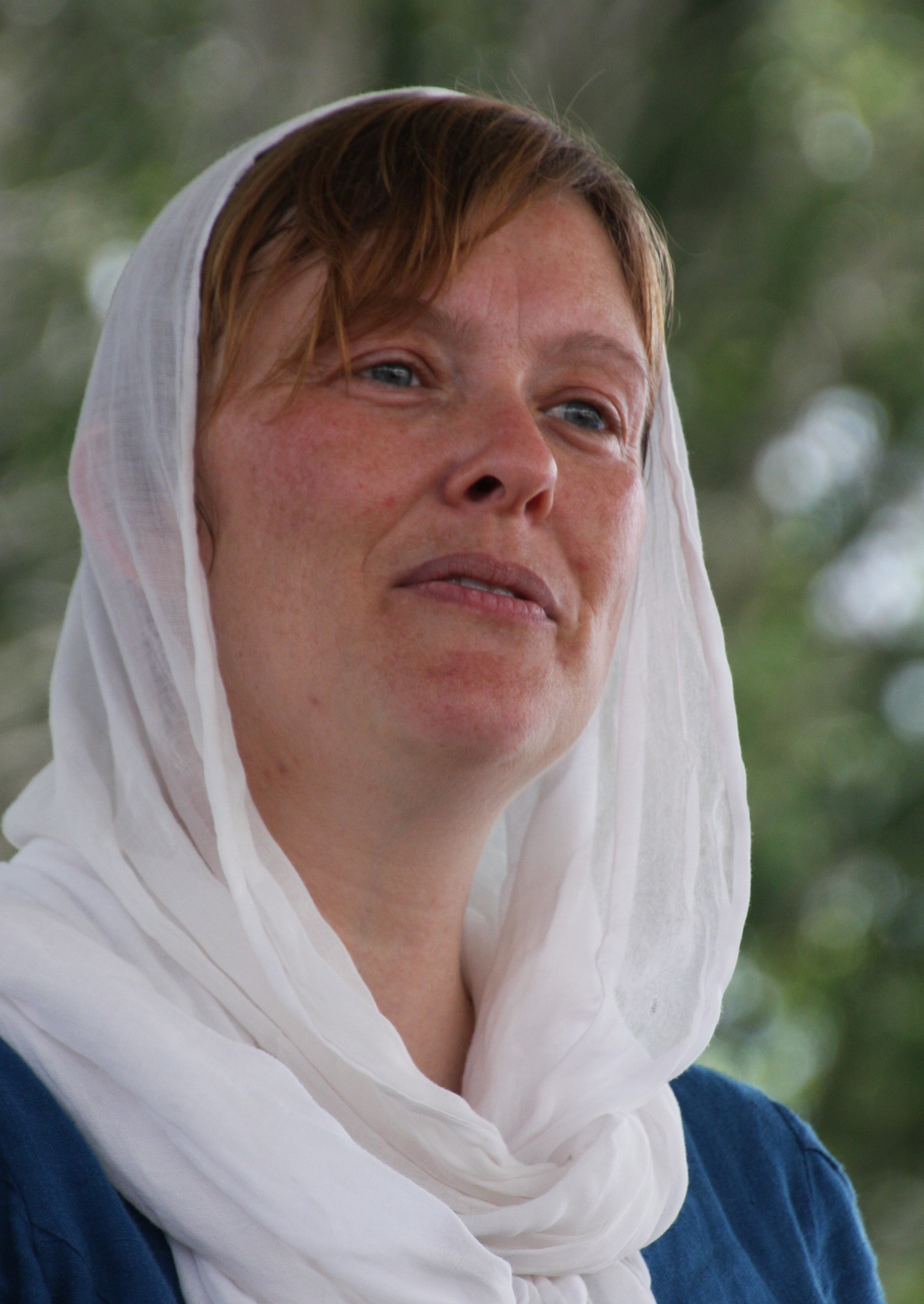
Heather Dale singing at an SCA event

The SCA holds its own events as a non-profit education organization for the benefit of SCA members and their guests. This is unlike most Renaissance fairs, which are open to the public and held mainly as entertainment for profit. Another noticeable difference is that SCA events are historically earlier than most Renaissance fairs. Each kingdom in the SCA runs its own schedule of events, which are announced in their kingdom newsletters (and usually posted on the kingdom website), but some of the largest SCA-sanctioned events, often called "wars", attract members from many kingdoms. Pennsic War, fought annually between the East Kingdom and Middle Kingdom, is the biggest event in the SCA. Likewise, Estrella War was held for over thirty years, mainly between two large regional SCA groups: the Kingdom of Atenveldt and the Kingdom of the Outlands. Most Estrella Wars were held near Phoenix, Arizona in late February and would last around 7–9 days. Several thousand people attended each year, some from as far as Sweden, Germany, France, Italy, Greece, and Australia. On July 13, 2021 it was announced that Estrella War was cancelled permanently. Other annual SCA wars include Gulf Wars in Gleann Abhann (formerly Meridies), Great Western War in Caid, War of the Lillies in Calontir and others. Other annual or semi-annual Kingdom-level events held analogously by most or all SCA kingdoms include Crown Tournament, Coronation, Kingdom Arts and Sciences competition and Queen's Prize. Additionally, most baronies in the SCA have their own traditional annual events such as Baronial Arts and Sciences competitions, championship tournaments, and often a Yule or Twelfth Night feast. Various SCA groups sometimes host collegia or symposia, where members gather for classes on various medieval arts and sciences and other SCA-related topics.

The minimum standard for attendance at an SCA event is "an attempt at pre-17th century clothing", and there is a general goal of maintaining a historical atmosphere. However, SCA members will use modern elements when necessary for personal comfort, medical needs, or to promote safety (e.g. wearing prescription eye-wear, using rattan for swords or shear thickening substances for padding). Unlike some other living history groups, most SCA gatherings do not reenact a specific time or place in history, leaving members free to dress as any culture within the SCA's time period.

=== Collegiums, symposiums and universities ===
Many branches of the SCA organize in-person and virtual events with peer-to-peer learning opportunities. Classes, lectures, and workshops may be offered as part of a local branch's regular scheduled activities or at a full-day or multi-day event. Some educational events are virtual or hybrid and many of the lectures are recorded and available to the public.

Educational events in the SCA may be referred to as academies, collegiums, schola, or universities. A collegium is a local in-person or virtual event offering multiple classes. A symposium is a society-wide event that focuses on a specific area of the SCA. A university in the SCA is an organized series of courses set up in the style of a modern university.

== Publications ==
The SCA produces two quarterly publications, The Compleat Anachronist and Tournaments Illuminated, and each kingdom publishes a monthly newsletter.

The Compleat Anachronist is a quarterly monographic series, each issue focused on a specific topic related to the period of circa 600–1600 in history. Issues are written by SCA members and have covered a wide range of topics.

Tournaments Illuminated is a quarterly magazine, each issue covering a range of topics and including several features such as news, a humor column, book reviews, war reports and various articles on SCA-related topics of interest.

== Organization ==
=== Corporate organization ===
The SCA is incorporated as a 501(c)(3) non-profit corporation in California, with its current headquarters in the city of Milpitas, California. It is headed by a board of directors, each of whom is nominated by the membership of the SCA, selected by sitting directors, and elected to serve for 3.5 years. Each director serves as an ombudsman for various kingdoms and society officers. The BoD, as it is called, is responsible for handling the corporate affairs of the SCA and is also in charge of certain disciplinary actions, such as revoking the membership status of participants who have broken Corpora regulations or modern law while participating in SCA activities. Because the SCA now has groups all over the world, it has also been incorporated in other countries, e.g. SCAA in Australia, SCANZ in New Zealand, SKA Nordmark in Sweden, SKA in Finland, and the UK CIC which covers both the UK and Ireland. These affiliated bodies work with the U.S. BoD with regard to Societal issues, but make all decisions affected by local law independently of the U.S. parent body. Although they agree to work in unity with the U.S. SCA board of directors, they are autonomous and are not bound by any ruling of the U.S. body.

=== Branches ===
The SCA is divided into administrative regions that it calls kingdoms. Smaller branches within those kingdoms include Principalities, Regions, Baronies, and Provinces; and local chapters are known as Cantons, Ridings, Shires, Colleges, Strongholds, and Ports. Kingdoms, principalities, and baronies have ceremonial rulers who preside over activities and issue awards to individuals and groups. Colleges, strongholds, and ports are local chapters (like a shire) that are associated with an institution, such as a school, military base, or even a military ship at sea.

All SCA branches are organized in descending order as follows:

- Kingdom: Area ruled by a King and Queen (typically covering several U.S. states or Canadian provinces, and can be as large as countries or collections of countries). Minimum members required 400.
  - Principality: Area within a kingdom ruled by a Prince and Princess (large area sometimes comprising entire states). Minimum members required 100.
  - Region: Equivalent of principality without ceremonial representative.
    - Barony: Area administered by a Baron and/or Baroness, the ceremonial representative(s) of the Crown. Minimum members required 25.
      - Canton: Local branch reporting through a barony (local chapter, which may be on the way to becoming a shire).
    - Province: Equivalent of barony without ceremonial representative.
      - Riding: Local branch reporting through a province.
    - Shire: Local branch reporting directly to a kingdom or principality. Minimum members required 5.
    - College: Institutional branch based at a school, research facility, etc. (may be a part of a larger local group or report directly to a principality or kingdom).
    - Stronghold: Institutional branch based at a military installation (may be a part of a larger local group or report directly to a principality or kingdom).
    - Port: Institutional branch based at a military installation in situations where groups of members will be detached for long periods, as with ships at sea (may be a part of a larger local group or report directly to a principality or kingdom).

Groups are active all over the United States, Canada, Europe, Australia, Japan, South Africa, and New Zealand, with scattered groups elsewhere, including China, Israel, Panama, and Thailand. At one time there was even a group on the aircraft carrier USS Nimitz, known as the "Shire of Curragh Mor" (anglicized Irish for "Big Boat"), and the shire's arms played on the Nimitz's ship's badge. There is also an active chapter in South Korea, the Stronghold of Warrior's Gate, with a mix of active duty military personnel from the several services and military-connected civilians. There are also non-territorial groups, usually called "households", which are not part of the Society's formal organization, the largest of which is the Mongol Empire-themed Great Dark Horde.

=== Kingdoms ===
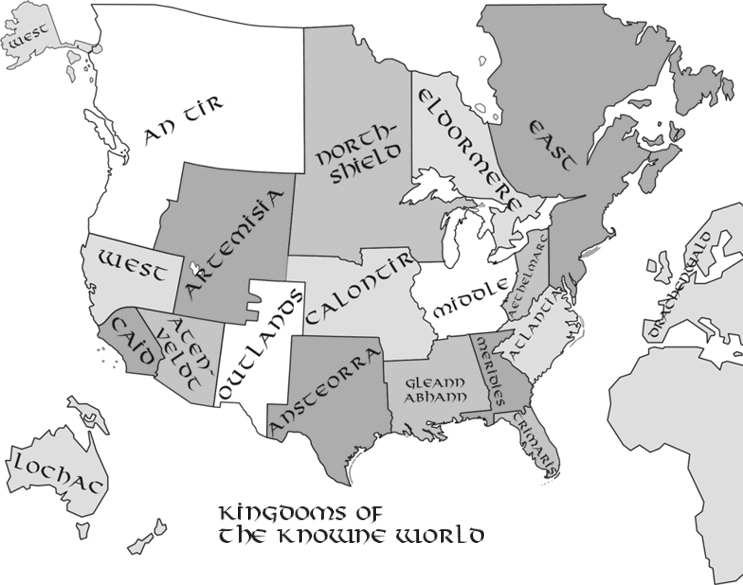
Kingdoms of the Knowne World, pre-2015

The twenty SCA Kingdoms and the geographic areas they cover are (in order of founding)

1. The West Kingdom was created when the Society originated in 1966. It currently includes Northern California, most of Nevada, Alaska, Japan, Korea, and the Pacific Rim (excluding Australia and New Zealand).
2. The Kingdom of the East was created in 1968. In the United States it covers eastern Pennsylvania, eastern New York, Delaware, New Jersey, Connecticut, Rhode Island, Massachusetts, Vermont, New Hampshire, and Maine. In Canada, it covers Quebec, Prince Edward Island, Nova Scotia, New Brunswick, and Newfoundland.
3. The Middle Kingdom was created in 1969. Its current borders include Ohio, Indiana, Illinois, lower Michigan, and parts of Kentucky, Iowa, and Ontario.
4. The Kingdom of Atenveldt was created in 1971. It originally encompassed all the lands between the West, East, and Middle Kingdoms, and now consists of the state of Arizona and the northeastern part of Nevada.
5. The Kingdom of Meridies was created in 1978 from the Kingdom of Atenveldt. Its borders currently encompass Alabama, southwestern Kentucky, almost all of Georgia; East and Central Tennessee; and a bit of the panhandle of Florida.
6. The Kingdom of Caid was created in 1978 from the Kingdom of the West. It currently encompasses Southern California, the Las Vegas metropolitan area, and Hawaii.
7. The Kingdom of Ansteorra was created in 1979 from the Kingdom of Atenveldt. Ansteorra covers Oklahoma, most of Texas, and the International Space Station.
8. The Kingdom of Atlantia was created in 1981 from the Kingdom of the East. Its borders cover Maryland, Virginia, North Carolina, and South Carolina, Augusta, Georgia, and Washington, D.C.
9. The Kingdom of An Tir was created in 1982 from the Kingdom of the West. It encompasses the US states of Oregon, Washington, and the northern tips of Idaho, and part of the Canadian province of British Columbia.
10. The Kingdom of Calontir was created in 1984 from the Kingdom of the Middle. It covers Kansas, Missouri, Iowa, Nebraska, and the 727xx Zip Code area around Fayetteville, Arkansas.
11. The Kingdom of Trimaris was created in 1985. It was split from the Kingdom of Meridies and is composed of the majority of Florida, Panama, and (falsely but humorously) Antarctica
12. The Kingdom of the Outlands was created in 1986 from the Kingdom of Atenveldt. It encompasses New Mexico and Colorado, parts of Wyoming, the Nebraska panhandle, and El Paso County and Hudspeth County in Texas.
13. The Kingdom of Drachenwald was created in 1993 from the Kingdom of the East. It is by far the largest kingdom in terms of land area, but not in population. It covers all of Europe (including islands), Africa, and the Middle East.
14. The Kingdom of Artemisia was created in 1997 from the Kingdom of Atenveldt. It currently covers Montana, southern Idaho, most of Utah, and southwestern Wyoming.
15. The Kingdom of Æthelmearc was created in 1997 from the Kingdom of the East. It covers northeastern/central/western Pennsylvania, central/western New York, and West Virginia.
16. The Kingdom of Ealdormere was created in 1998 from the Kingdom of the Middle. It comprises most of the Canadian province of Ontario.
17. The Kingdom of Lochac was created in 2002 from the West Kingdom (Australia) and the Kingdom of Caid (New Zealand). It encompasses the entirety of Australia and New Zealand, and was granted prior title by the Board of the Society to the Australian administered parts of Antarctica, in contradiction of the later claim put forward by the Kingdom of Trimaris. In 2017, the SCA groups in China became part of Lochac from the West Kingdom
18. The Kingdom of Northshield was created in 2004 from the Kingdom of the Middle. It covers North Dakota, South Dakota, Minnesota, Wisconsin, and the upper peninsula of Michigan. It also extends into Canada, encompassing Manitoba and northwestern Ontario.
19. The Kingdom of Gleann Abhann was created in 2005 from the Kingdom of Meridies. It covers Mississippi, Louisiana, most of Arkansas, and the western edge of Tennessee including the Memphis area.
20. The Kingdom of Avacal was created in 2015 from the Kingdom of An Tir. It covers Alberta, Saskatchewan, Yukon, Northwest Territories and part of British Columbia.

=== Officers ===
The Society as a whole, each kingdom, and each local group within a kingdom, all have a standard group of officers with titles loosely based on medieval equivalents.

- Seneschal: The seneschal acts as the administrative head, or president of the group. Every local group is required to have a local seneschal who reports to the kingdom's seneschal.
- Chancellor of the Exchequer or Reeve: The treasurer, who handles the financial matters of the group. Every local group is required to have one. The Society Chancellor of the Exchequer, who administrates the kingdom and local reeves, reports to the Society Treasurer who handles the corporate finances. In most kingdoms the Exchequer (kingdom or local) are some of the only officers to have a financial warrant to collect gate fees and handle money for the society.
- Knight Marshal: The combat supervisor, the knight marshal administrates all combat activities for the branch, including armored combat, rapier combat, archery and equestrian. A local group is required to have one in order to host combat activities.
- Minister of Arts and Sciences: Sometimes split into two offices, one for arts and one for sciences, this office coordinates arts and sciences activities for the group, arranging monthly classes and demonstrations and a larger yearly collegium (a two- to three-day workshop with multiple classes), and leading participants to others who work in fields of their interest.
- Herald: This officer is in charge of heraldic activities, such as the creation and registration of names and arms. Each kingdom has a College of Heralds which prepares submissions to go to the Society College of Arms, headed by the Laurel Sovereign of Arms.
- Chatelaine or Hospitaller or Gold Key: In charge of welcoming and facilitating new participants into the SCA including recruiting, onboarding, and transitioning members from other branches. They are also responsible for Gold Key, which provides loaner garb, and occasionally feast gear and introductory literature, for new members.
- Marshal: Supervises a specific combat-related activity, ensuring safety of participants and refereeing where applicable. A marshal must be certified for the type of activity they oversee; as such there are armored combat marshals, rapier marshals, target archery marshals, equestrian marshals, etc. A marshal of a given certification must be present for that particular activity to take place at an event.
- Kingdom Waiver Secretary: In charge of maintaining and tracking liability waivers for events.
- Chronicler: Produces and edits the group's newsletter. The Society Chronicler monitors each of the kingdom and local group's chroniclers, while the SCA's two organization-wide publications, Tournaments Illuminated and The Compleat Anachronist, each have their own editor-in-chief.
- Minister of Children, Minister of Youth or Youth Activities Officer: Arranging and officiating children's activities.
- Historian: Recording the history of the group, from the local to the Society level.
- Webminister: Derived from webmaster, this officer is in charge of maintaining the Internet presence of the group.
- Social Media: Responsible for use of social media on a variety of platforms and to serve as the "official voice" of the branch groups of the SCA.
- Chirurgeon: In charge of safety and modern first aid. First formed in 1983, the office was dissolved on August 10, 2015 amid concerns of legal liability.

== Culture of the group ==
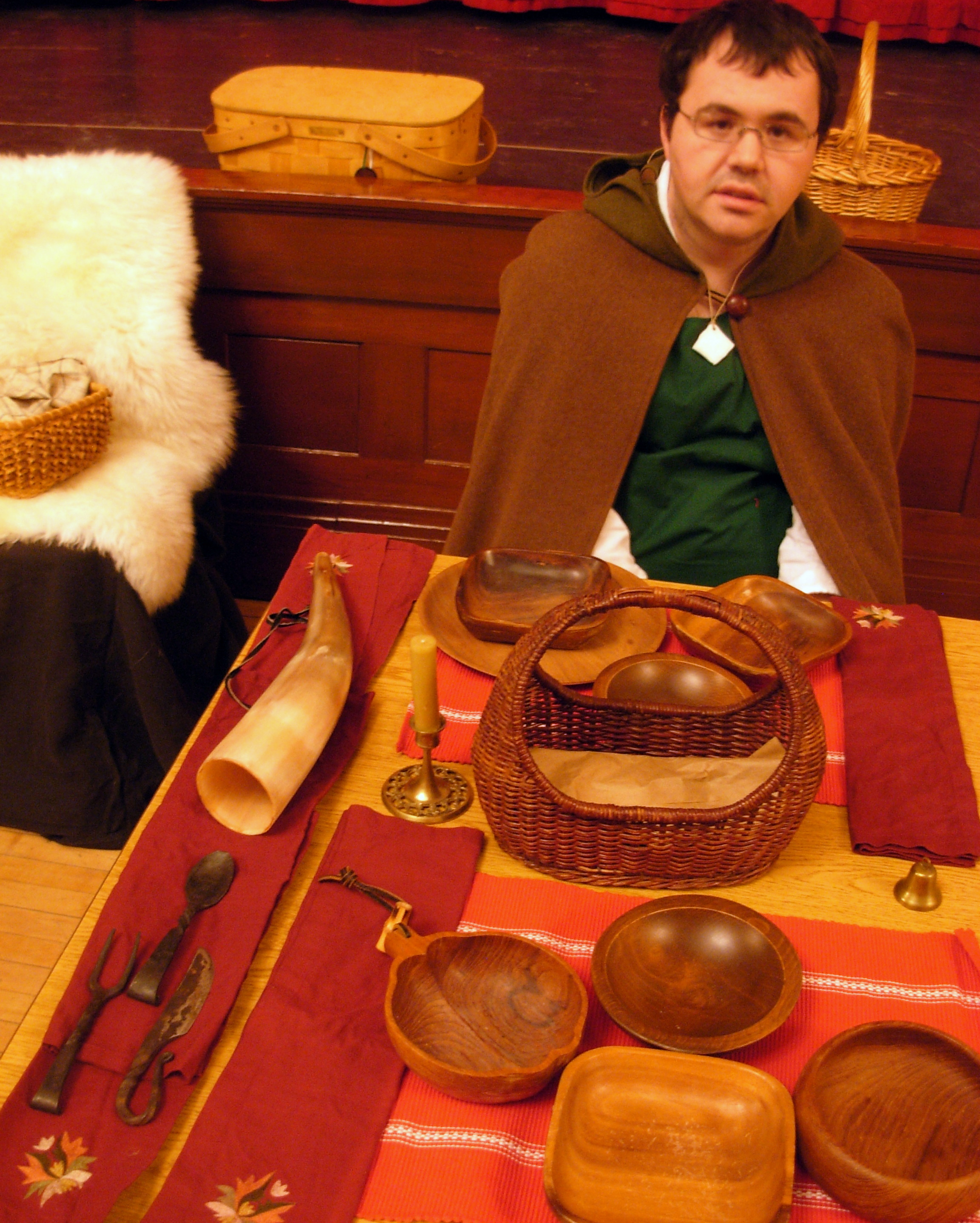
An SCA participant in historically based clothing prepared for a feast

Members of the SCA study and take part in a variety of activities, including combat and chivalry, archery, heraldry, equestrian activities, costuming, cooking, metalworking, woodworking, leather crafting, music, dance, calligraphy, fiber arts, and others as practiced during the member's time period.

=== Personae ===
To aid historical recreation, participants in the SCA create historically plausible characters known individually as personae. To new members, a persona can simply be a costume and a name used for weekend events, while other members may study and create an elaborate personal history. The goal of a well-crafted persona is a historically accurate person who might have lived in a particular historical time and place. The SCA has members with an interest in onomastics who assist in creating appropriate persona names.

In addition, claiming to be a specific historical individual, especially a familiar one such as Genghis Khan, Julius Caesar, Queen Elizabeth I, or a familiar fictional character such as Robin Hood or Aladdin is not permitted. Likewise, one is not allowed to claim the persona of another SCA member past or present.

=== Heraldry ===
A major dimension to the SCA is its internal system of heraldry. Any member of the society may apply to register a name and device for their persona, which are checked by the heralds for uniqueness and period authenticity, before being blazoned and recorded in the society's Armorial. The system has evolved since the formation of the society; and now has three Sovereigns of Arms, with Principal Heralds for each Kingdom, who oversee deputy officers for matters such as heraldic education and processing registrations, and local officers (generally one for each local chapter) who assist the local participants. In addition to design of arms, heralds in the Society also provide services such as voice heraldry (similar to a master of ceremonies) at tournaments and official functions, and organizing tournament brackets or "lists."

=== Royalty ===
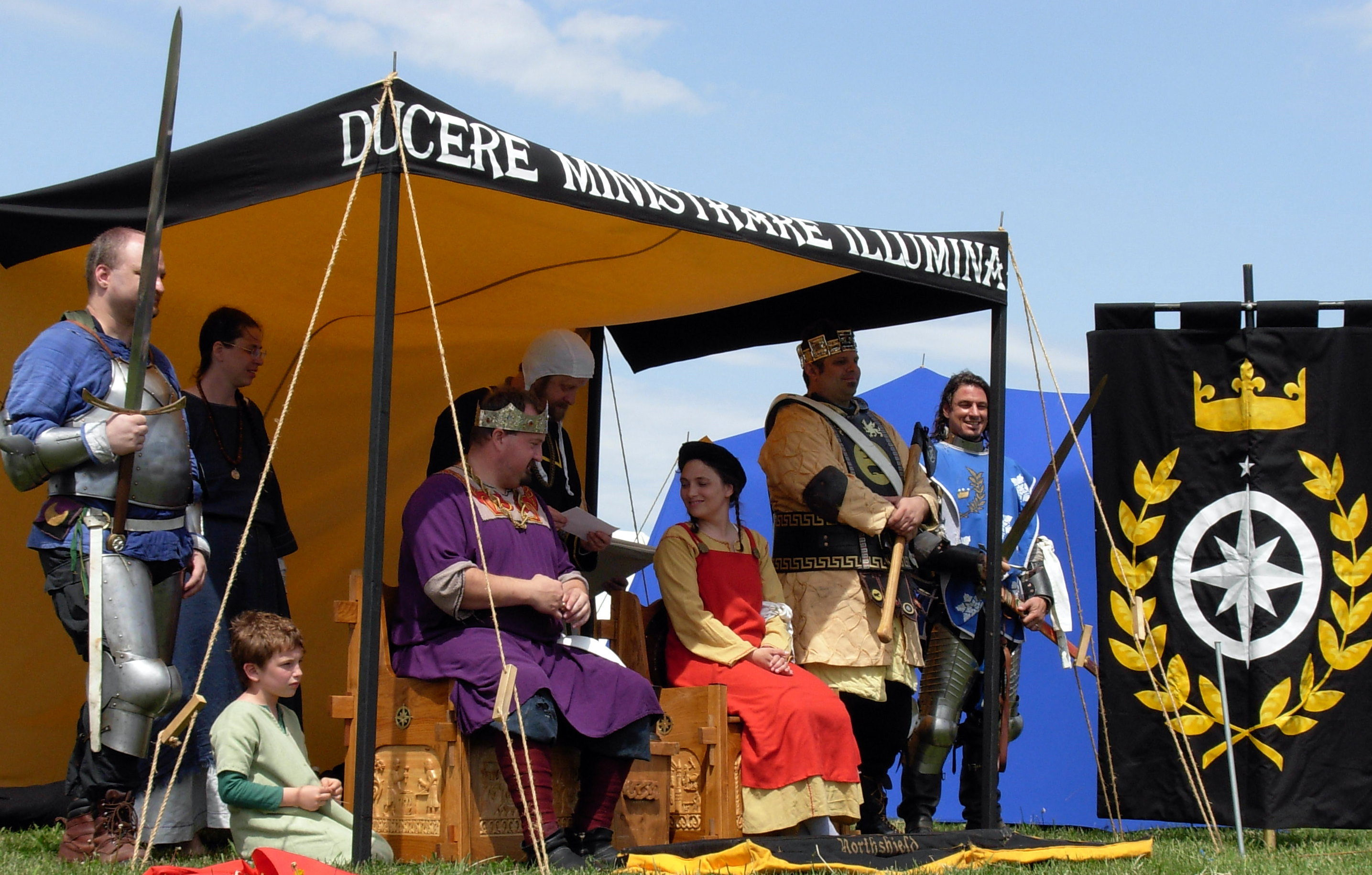
Northshield court at an outdoor SCA event

The SCA has ceremonial rulers chosen by winning tournaments (Kings/Queens, Princes/Princesses) in SCA armoured combat. Barons and Baronesses are appointed by Royalty, although some baronies hold elections or competitions to choose their preferred Baron and/or Baroness. One of the primary functions of state for reigning monarchs is to recognize participant achievement through awards. Most awards denote excellence in a specific pursuit such as local service, arts and sciences, and combat. Some awards change the precedence and title of the recipient, giving them the privilege of being known as "Lord"/"Lady", "Baron", "Duchess", "Master", and so forth. High level awards are often given with the consultation of the other people who have received the award, such as peerages and consulting orders. The Crown has some authority over other matters relating to leadership, but the extent of this varies from kingdom to kingdom.

==== Rule by right of arms ====
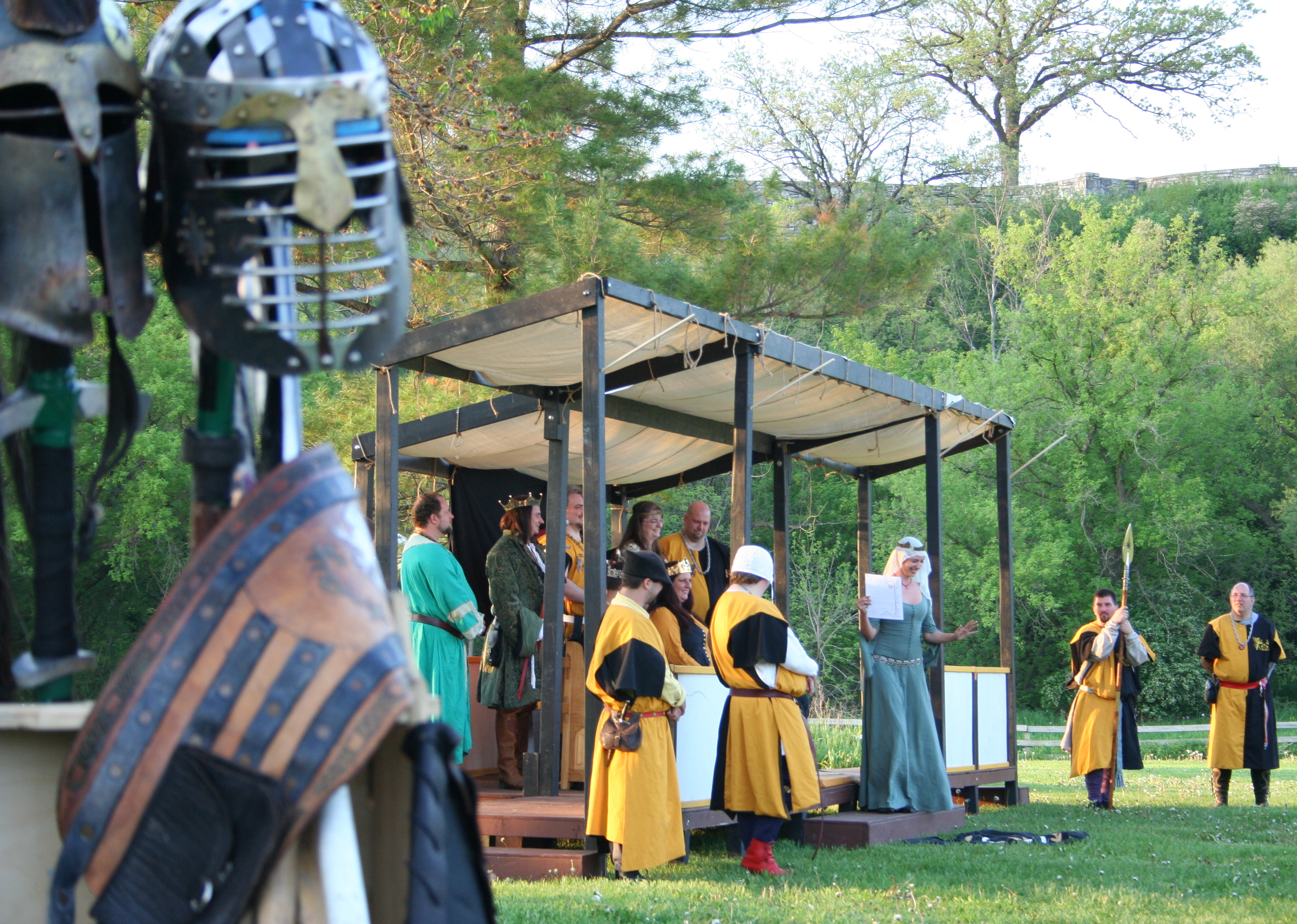
An SCA tournament of chivalry

Each SCA kingdom is "ruled" by a king and queen chosen by winning a Crown Tournament in armored combat. Corpora require this to be held as a "properly constituted armored combat" tournament. The winner of the Crown Tournament and his/her consort are styled "Crown Prince and Princess" and serve an advisory period (three to six months, depending upon the scheduling of the Crown Tournament) under the current king and queen prior to acceding to the throne and ruling in their turn.

This selection method is not based on how actual medieval monarchs were chosen, as there is no record of one being selected by tournament combat in this manner. There are, however, literary and historical bases for the custom, most famously the tournament in Sir Walter Scott's Ivanhoe. In the Middle Ages, there were a number of different "mock king" games, some of which involved some form of combat, such as King of the Mountain or the King of Archers. In the 17th century the Cotswold Games were developed, the winner of which was declared to be "king". Also, the medieval sagas contain accounts of uniting petty kingdoms under a single king through actual combat.

The SCA's first event did not choose a "king". Fighters vied for the right to declare their ladies (only men fought at the first event) "fairest", later called the "Queen of Love and Beauty".

=== Peerage orders ===
The highest ranking titles in the SCA belong to the royalty, followed by the former royalty. Former kings and queens become counts and countesses (dukes and duchesses if they have reigned more than once), and former princes and princesses of principalities become viscounts and viscountesses. This system is not historically based, but was developed out of practical necessity early in the Society's history.

Directly beneath this "landed" nobility (current and former royalty) rank the highest awards, the peerages. The SCA has five orders of peerage with one split into two parts: the Order of the Chivalry, awarded for skill at arms in armored combat, split into the knights and the masters of arms; the Order of the Laurel, awarded for skill in the arts and sciences; the Order of the Pelican, awarded for outstanding service to the Society; the Order of Defense, awarded for skill at arms in rapier combat; and the Order of the Mark, awarded for ranged combat prowess, such as archery. In several kingdoms the Order of the Rose, made up of former consorts, is considered a peerage equal to the other five.

==== Elevation to peerage ====
Peerages are bestowed by the Crown (the sovereign and consort) of a kingdom. In most cases, this is done with the consent of the members of a given peerage, often at their suggestion. The Society's Bylaws state that "the Crown may elevate subjects to the peerage by granting membership in one of the orders conferring a Patent of Arms, after consultation with the members of the Order within the kingdom, and in accordance with the laws and customs of the kingdom. Restriction: to advance a candidate to the Order of the Chivalry, a knight of the Society (usually the king) must bestow the accolade".

== Cultural impact ==
In Number of the Beast (1980), Robert A. Heinlein portrayed an SCA tournament where live weapons were used and the battles actually fought to the "death". The defeated combatants were either transported to an alternate reality where medical technology was advanced enough that they could be revived from any wound or transported to the alternate reality that was Valhalla. The contestants' desires were placed in sealed envelopes prior to the tournament, which were destroyed if the competitor won and obeyed if a competitor lost.

In Ariel (1983), a post-apocalyptic fantasy by Steven R. Boyett, technology suddenly stops working and sorcery and sword fight take over. Several characters who are former SCA members attribute their survival to their SCA experience.

The 1986 fantasy novel The Folk of the Air by Peter S. Beagle was written after the author attended a few early SCA events circa 1968; but he has repeatedly stated that he then studiously avoided any contact with the SCA itself for almost two decades, so that his description of a fictitious "League for Archaic Pleasures" would not be "contaminated" by contact with the actual real-life organization.

Members of the SCA are given pivotal roles in S. M. Stirling's Emberverse series, where their skills in pre-industrial technology and warfare become invaluable in helping humanity adapt when all modern technology (including firearms) ceases working.

The novel Murder at the War (Knightfall in paperback edition) by Mary Monica Pulver is a murder mystery set entirely at the SCA's largest annual event, Pennsic War.

In David Weber's 1996 science fiction novel Honor Among Enemies, main character Honor Harrington mentions that her uncle is a member of the SCA and that he taught her to shoot from the hip (the time the SCA covers having been moved up to the 19th century in the future era in which the novel is set, to include cowboy and Civil War reenactors).

In May 1999, The Onion ran a front-page article headlined "Society for Creative Anachronism Seizes Control of Russia" featuring photos of actual SCA participants from the Barony of Jaravellir (Madison, Wisconsin).

In Christopher Stasheff's "Warlock" series, the inhabitants of the planet Gramarye are revealed to be descended from SCA participants. A prequel, Escape Velocity, describes how the SCAdians first came to Gramarye, and how lands were assigned to the royal peers.

In John Ringo's The Council Wars science fiction series, characters with SCA or SCA-like experience help their society recover from a catastrophic loss of technology.

== Controversies and deaths ==
In 2012, the SCA agreed to pay $1.3 million to settle a lawsuit brought on behalf of 11 victims of child sexual abuse. The abuse was committed in Pennsylvania at the private residence of Ben Schragger, who pleaded guilty to criminal charges in 2004. Schragger was a member of the SCA at the time of the abuse. His membership was suspended on his arrest and permanently revoked after his plea. The lawsuit contended that the SCA had not conducted a background check on Schragger, though at the time the organization did not perform background checks in general and there is no legal requirement to do so.

In 2018, Peter Barclay died after being impaled by a lance during equestrian activities at an SCA event. Barclay was an experienced equestrian and his death was deemed an accident.
