= Botn =

Johan-Olav Botn (born 1999) is a Norwegian biathlete.

Botn may also refer to the following locations:

- Botn, Evenes, a village in Evenes Municipality in Nordland county, Norway
- Botn, Saltdal, a village in Saltdal Municipality in Nordland county, Norway
- Botn (Trøndelag), a lake in Indre Fosen Municipality in Trøndelag county, Norway

== See also ==
- Battle of the Nations (BotN), a recreation of medieval tournaments
- Botnen (disambiguation)
