= IMSF =

IMSF is an acronym for:

- Indian Marine Commando Force an acronym the former Name of an Indian elite unit see MARCOS (India)
- International Mass Spectrometry Foundation a mass spectrometry society
- International Mars Science Foundation a fictional space agency of Mars (2016 TV series)
- The International Medieval Combat Federation, (IMCF) is a global historical full contact sport fighting revival movement, in which combatants use historically accurate reproduction medieval and early modern armour and blunted weapons to engage in competitive fights according to authentic historical tournament rules.
