= Armored combat (sport) =

Full contact sport based on medieval hand-to-hand combat

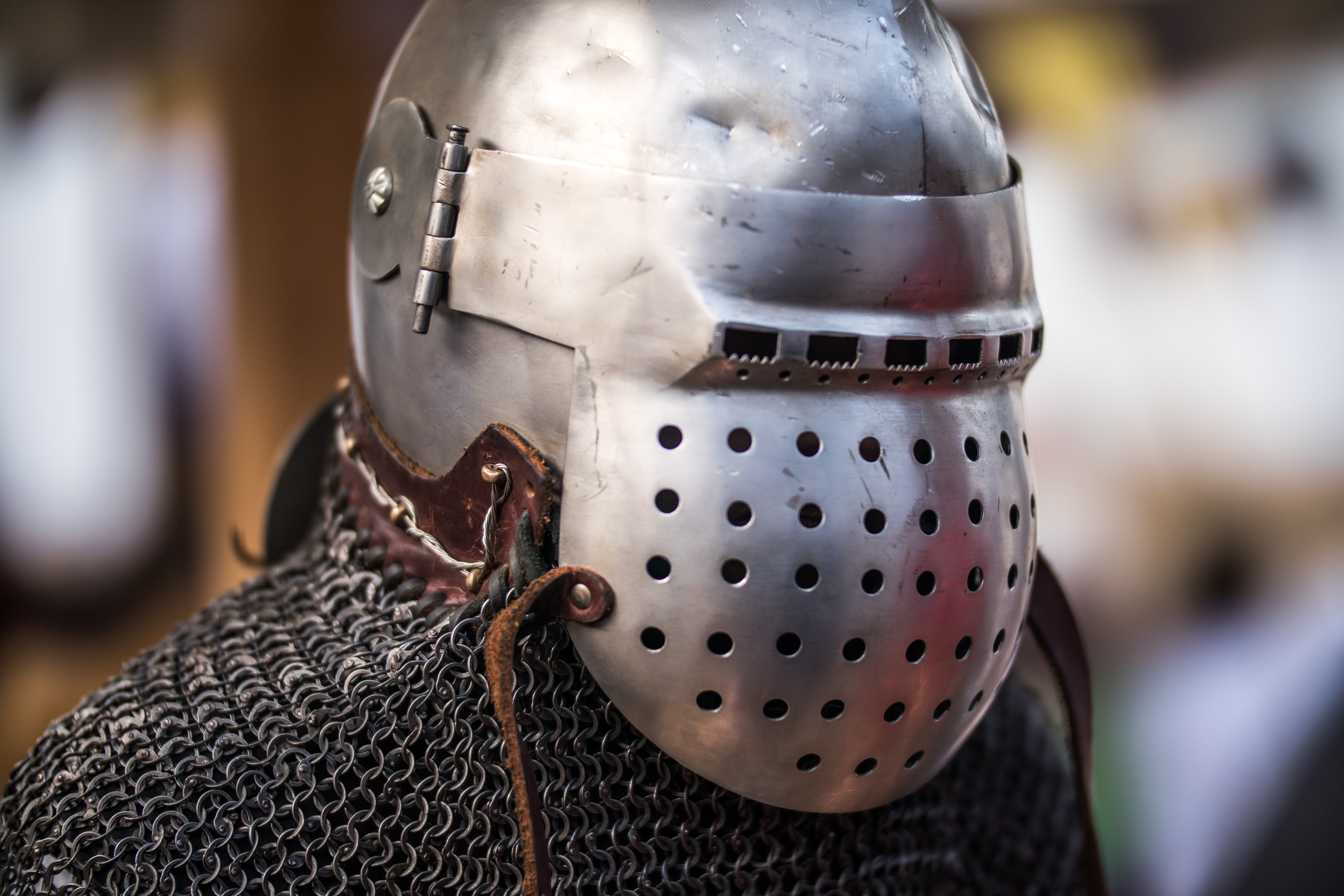
- Highest governing body: Buhurt International
- Nicknames: Many (Note: List of names for the sport: "armored combat", "medieval armored combat", "buhurt", "historical medieval battles", "medieval combat", "medieval fighting", "knight fight", "steel fighting", "steel combat", "full contact steel combat", "full contact medieval combat", "full contact medieval fighting", "full contact medieval armored combat", "full steel armored combat", "full steel combat", "medieval full contact fighting", "modern medieval battle", "medieval MMA", "armored MMA", "medieval armored MMA", "medieval cage fighting", and "soft armored fighting".)
- First played: In its current form, 1990s in Eastern Europe.
- Clubs: 100+ individual teams

Characteristics
- Contact: Full contact fighting
- Team members: "1 vs 1", "2 vs 2", "5 vs 5", "10 vs 10", "12 vs 12", "16 vs 16", "30 vs 30" (Note: Including less common team sizes: "7 vs 7", "21 vs 21", "150 vs 150", "200 vs 200".)
- Mixed-sex: yes, also separate.
- Type: Outdoor or indoor, field or arena.
- Equipment: full suit of metal armor, shields, and weapons, such as swords, mace, and polearms.

Presence
- Country or region: Predominantly North America and Europe, with smaller popularity in Latin America and Asia.

Armored combat or buhurt (from Old French béhourd: "joust", "tournament") or medieval combat or historical medieval battles (HMB), among other names, is a modern full contact fighting sport with steel blunt weapons characteristic of the Middle Ages. Fighters are covered in full modern-produced protective armour, made from steel or titanium alloy, made to aesthetically be close to their historical counterparts with modern protection techniques. Hits and blows may be aimed at any parts of the body (with the limitations set in the regulations); both wrestling and percussive techniques are permitted, thrusts are forbidden. Unlike staged battles, that can be seen at festivals of historical reenactment of the Middle Ages armored combat is a competive full contact international sport with many long running national and international tournament series.

As of 2026, the current active international governing bodies are Buhurt International (BI), International Medieval Combat Federation (IMCF), Magna Carta, and Alianza Latinoamericana de Combate Medieval. There are national governing bodies in 30+ countries predominately in the Western world and Latin america with some popularity in Asia, such as China and Japan. Popular US fight promotions and leagues, are Armored MMA, Armored Combat Sports, and Armored Combat Worldwide.

== History ==
SCA armoured combat using rattan based clubs

Armored combat as a modern sport began in the 1960s when a group of hobbyists in Berkeley, California, hosted a tournament in their backyard, leading to the creation of the Society for Creative Anachronism (SCA). SCA would create SCA armoured combat with the first tournaments held in 1966. SCA armoured combat would use historically accurate armor in mock combat using rattan based weapons.

The first tournaments armored combat, also referred to as buhurt, commonly became distinct from SCA armoured combat date back to the first large-scale battles with the use of steel weapons, which were held in Russia, Belarus and Ukraine in the late 1990s and the beginning of the 21st century, at times when in the rest of the Eastern European countries reenactors used wooden or textolite weapons. An example is the festival "Zhelezny Grad" (Iron Town) held in Izborsk, where buhurts involving hundreds of fighters took place or Sword of Russia tournament from 1996.

The first European Championship took place in Ukraine in 2005, with nominations "Sword and Shield", and "Sword vs Sword".

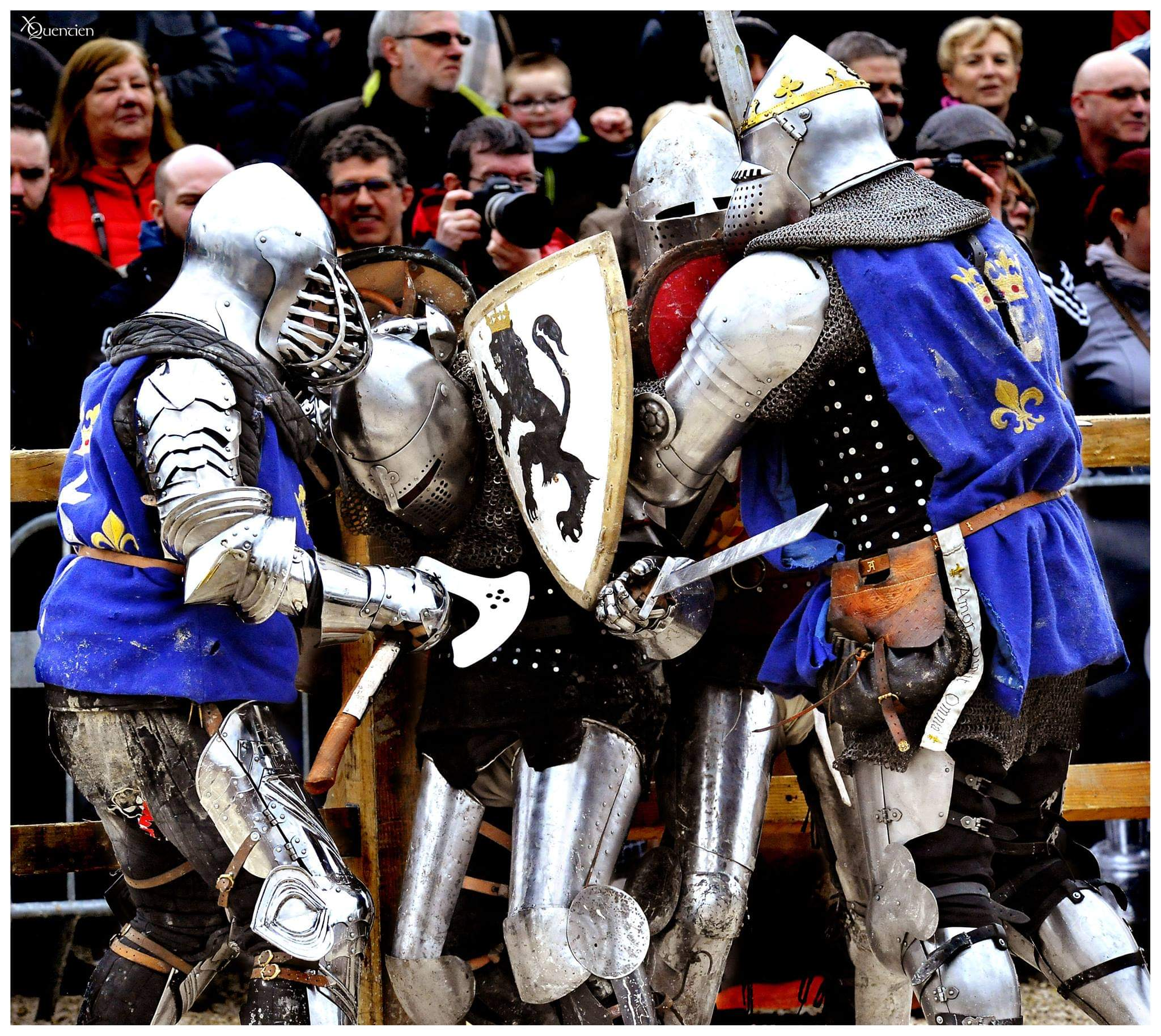
Mass battle at coupe de France 2017

The expansion of buhurt as a sport truly began in 2009 after the first held Battle of the Nations in Khotyn Fortress in Ukraine, where participants from Ukraine, Poland, Belarus and Russia competed under unified rules and regulations. The organizers of the Battle of Nations formed an international governing body called Historical Medieval Battles (HMB). This event attracted participants from the rest of Europe and outside of it and buhurt gained worldwide attention from the reenactment community. Battle of the Nations was held every other year at a new fortress or castle. The popularity of buhurt grew in the United States in the 2010s. One such organization, Armored Combat League (which split in 2019, creating Armored Combat Worldwide and Armored Combat Sports) was featured in a series called Knight Fight on History Channel.

Due to accusations of corruption, cheating, and unsafe practices from the Russia controlled HMB, and other grievances, various members of buhurt national organizations, spearheaded by US, Poland, UK, broke away, forming a new rival governing body, called International Medieval Combat Federation (IMCF), founded in 2013.

In 2015 the Russian mixed martial arts promotion M-1 Global began running outrance fights, calling it Russian medieval MMA, creating a small long running competitive circuit.

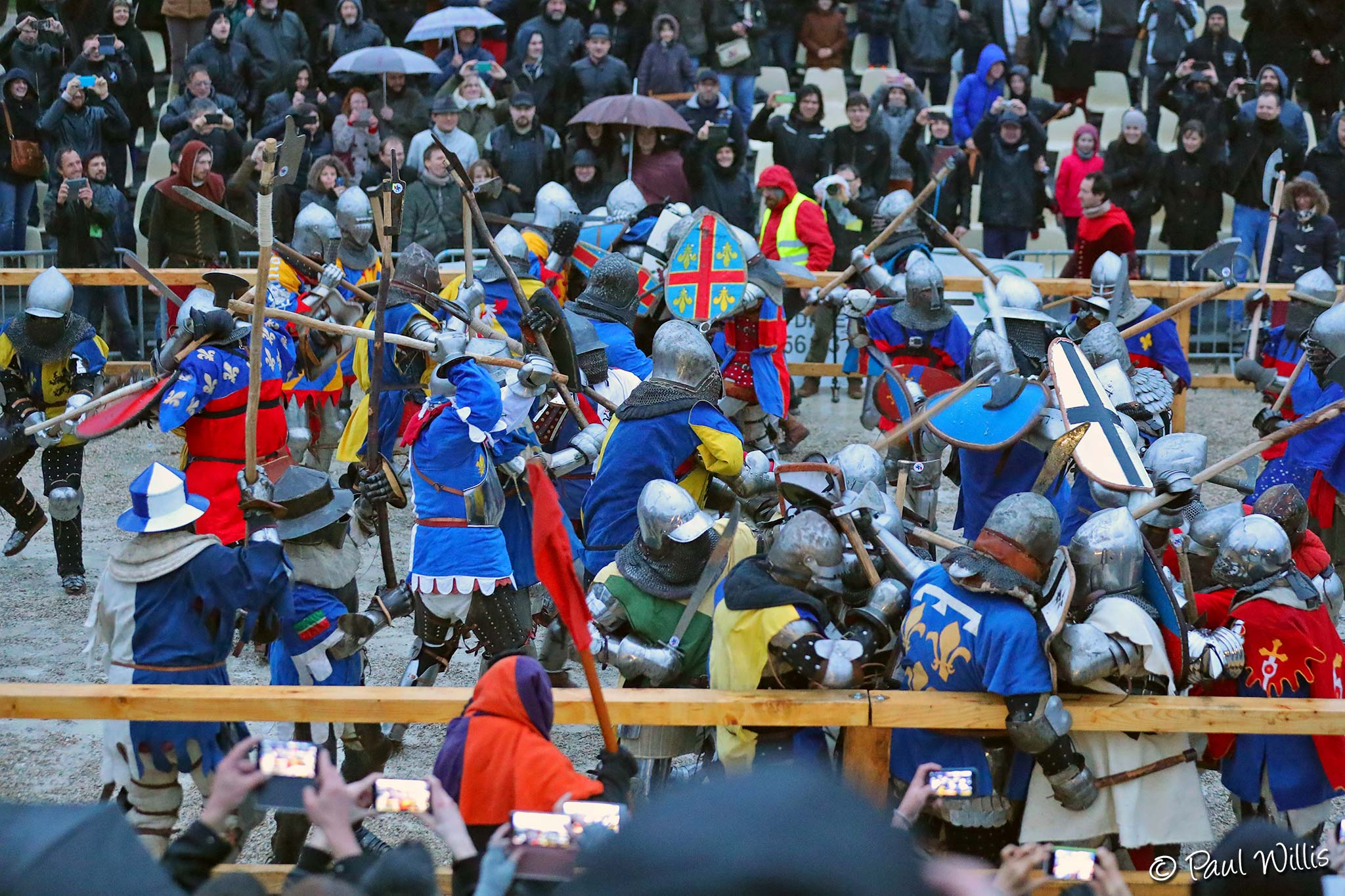
16 vs 16 mass battle

In 2022, Battle of Nations canceled their tournament series and later dissolved due to the Russo-Ukrainian war. Due to concerns about HMB International's Russian controlled governance, national governing bodied voted to dissolve HMB, with most later forming Buhurt League, which would later evolve into Buhurt International (BI), which became the primary international governing body for armored combat. In the United States, Medieval Combat USA (MCUSA) became the official national representative of Buhurt International. Alianza Latinoamericana De Combate Medivieval is the primary international governing body for Latin America.

In 2022, the fight promotion Armored MMA (AMMA) was formed. Armored MMA organizes outrance fights in an MMA style octagon cage match as well as promotes and broadcasts fights more similar to traditional pro martial art fights, attracting spectators in person and online, with various matches and clips going viral, helping to draw attention and grow the sport. Other similar outrance focused fight promotion organizations are The Armored League (TAL), The New Era, Armored Combat Clash (ACC).

In 2024 the HMB Russian national governing body after having been alienated from the rest of the international armored combat community, created a replacement for Battle of Nations, an ongoing tournament series called HMB Russia Fest in Vyborg, Russia, attended by Russian and allied athletes, in addition to creating a new international governing body called Magna Carta founded and controlled by the former Russian owners of the dissolved HMB.

== Competitive categories ==
Armored combat, like any other sport, has several categories. All its categories can be divided into mass and singles.

=== Single categories ===
Single categories, namely "one vs one" are divided into tournaments and professional fights.

==== Duels ====
Points / hits are counted in one on one tournaments known as duels. A fighter must score the most points to win, this is usually done in rounds of one minute with points scored based on striking. The duels categories are divided into:

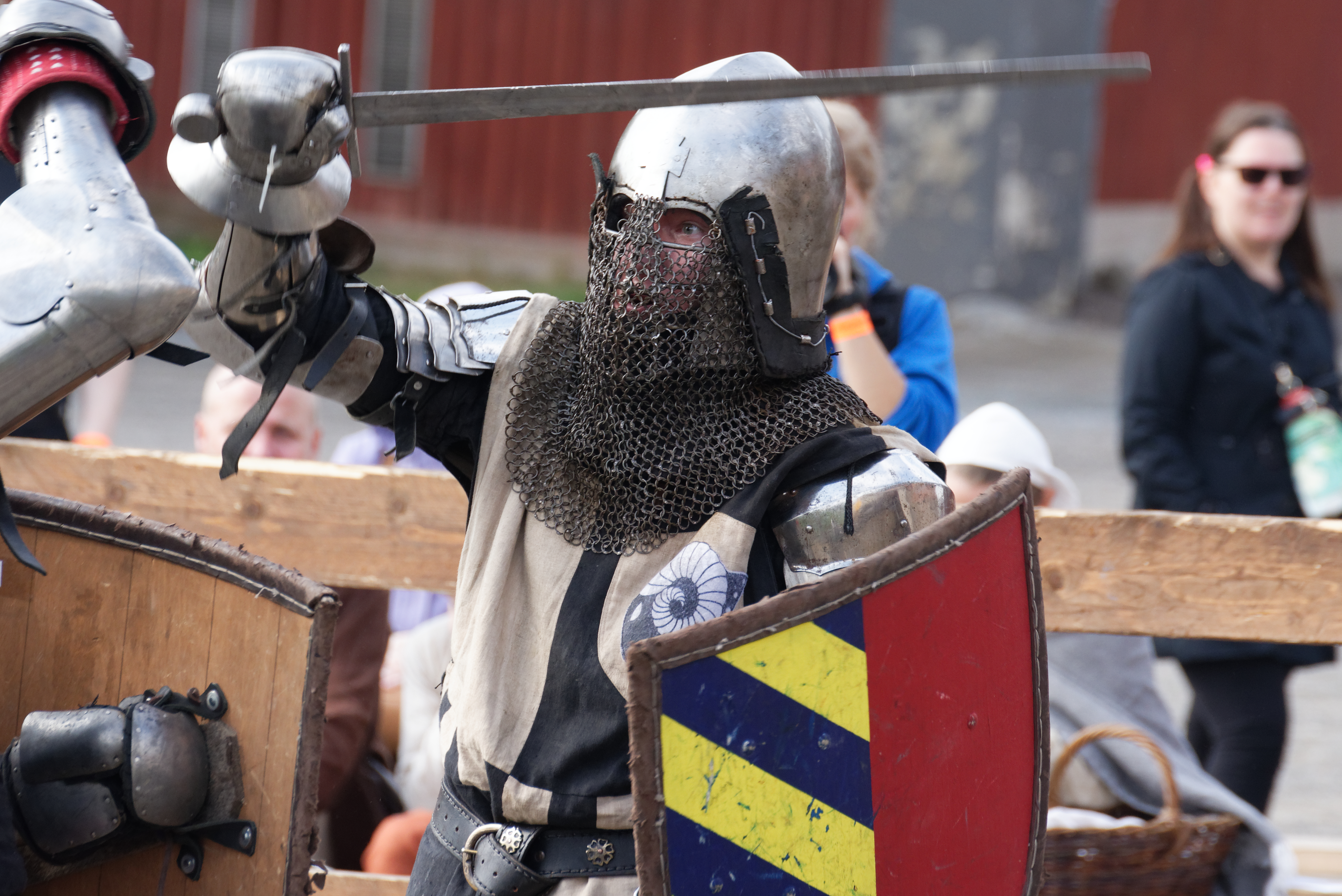
Use of Sword and shield

- "Sword and shield" fighters use a sword and shield in two rounds of one minute, with an extra round of thirty seconds if the result of the first two rounds is a draw. A strike to the head or torso is worth two points with the rest of the body worth one point. At the end of the rounds the fighter with the most points is declared the winner.

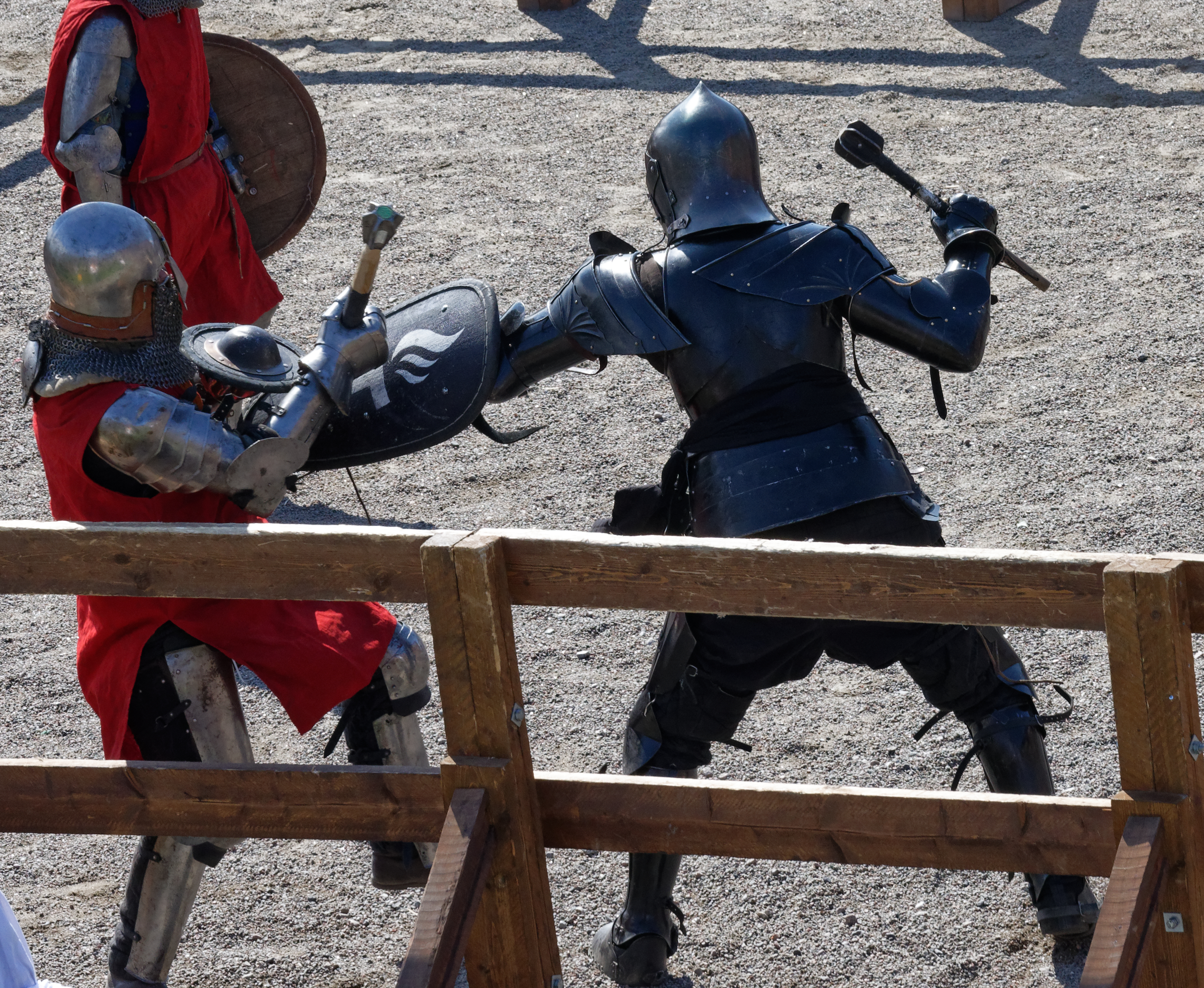
Mace and buckler. Using mace as an alternate to a sword

- "Sword and buckler" fighters use a sword and buckler, in three rounds of no longer than one minute, each round is continued until a fighter reaches five points or the time runs out. All strikes are counted as one point. The fighter who wins two rounds first is declared the winner.

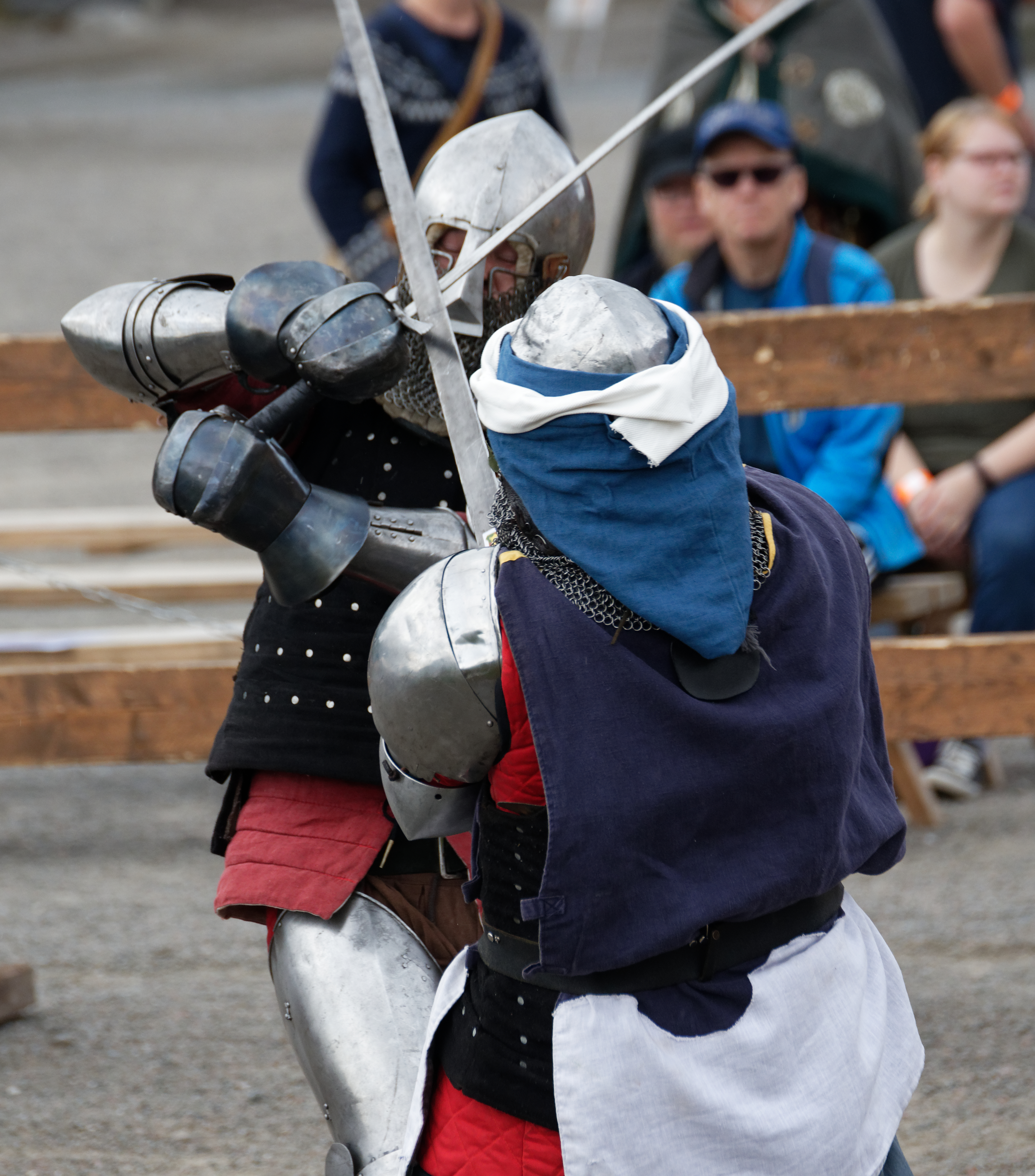
Use of longsword

- "Longsword" fighters use longswords in two rounds of one minute, with an extra round of thirty seconds if the result of the first two rounds is a draw. Strikes to the head and torso are worth two points with the rest is the body worth one point, strikes to the head and torso are worth one point if only one hand is used for the strike. At the end of the rounds the fighter with the most points is declared the winner.

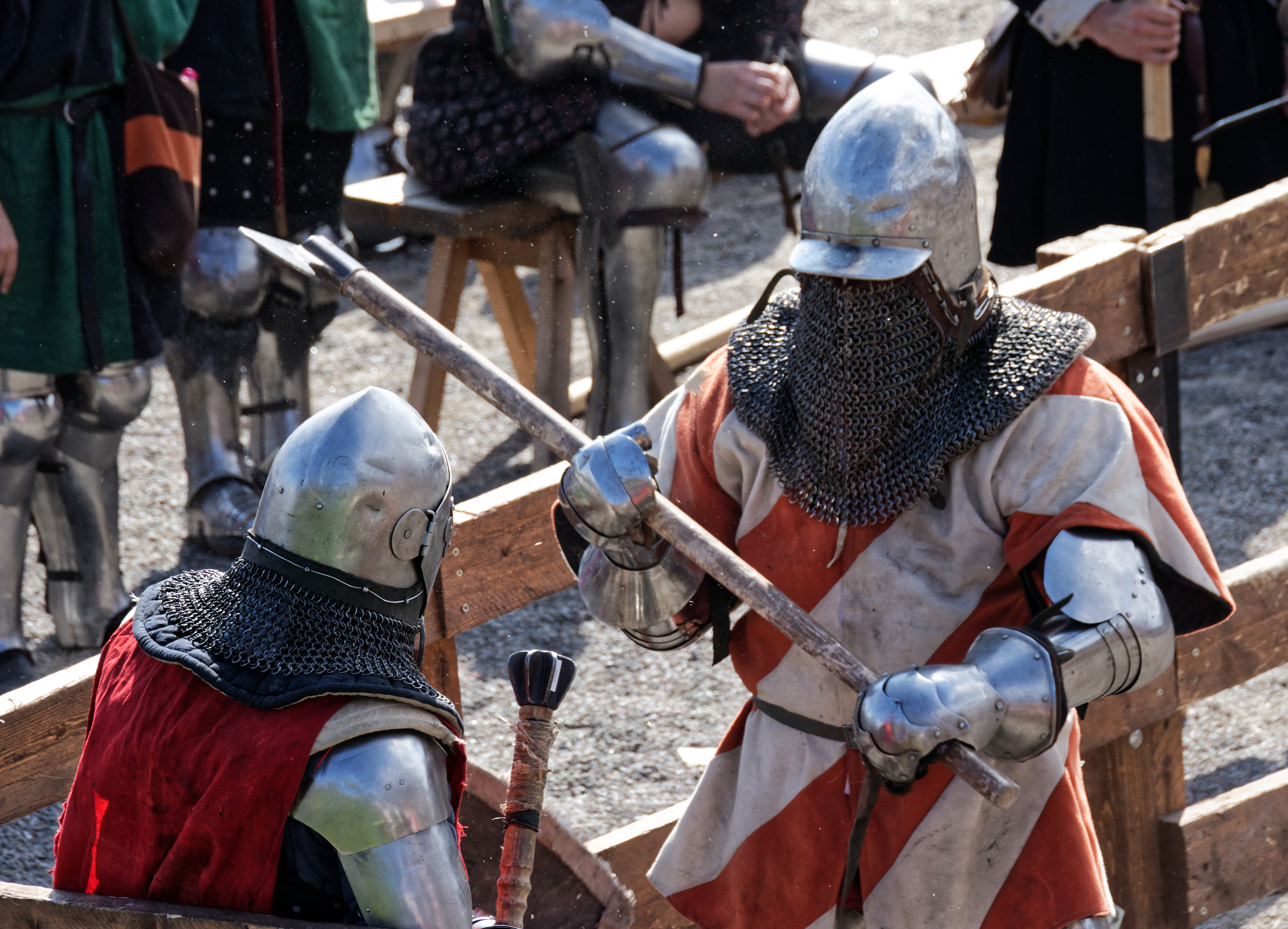
Use of Polearm

- "Polearm" fighters use polearms, usually Poleaxe, in two rounds of one minute, with an extra thirty seconds if the result of the first two rounds is a draw. A strike to the head and torso are worth two points with the rest of the body worth one point, strikes to the head and torso are worth one point if only one hand is used for the strike. At the end of the rounds the fighter with the most points is declared the winner.

There is also a category called "Triathlon": three rounds with different weapons, the first one – "longsword", the second one – "sword and buckler", the third one – "sword and shield."

==== Outrance ====
The second "single" armored combat category is outrance, also referred to as pro-fight, as well as unofficially nicknamed medieval MMA or armored MMA. Outrance is similar to duals but with a wider range of legal strikes, and inclusion of grappling and wrestling; overall being closer to submission fighting. Outrance fights are categorized into various weight classes. A fight is held in the format of "two rounds of two minutes" with a third round if the fights end in a tie. According to the rules, any techniques aimed at delivering blows to any part of the body are allowed, with the exceptions of: blows aimed at the neck, back of the knee, groin, eyes, feet, back of the head, and thrusts, which are prohibited in all armored combat categories. All other things, including grappling and 10-second ground fighting with no active movements of the opponents are allowed.

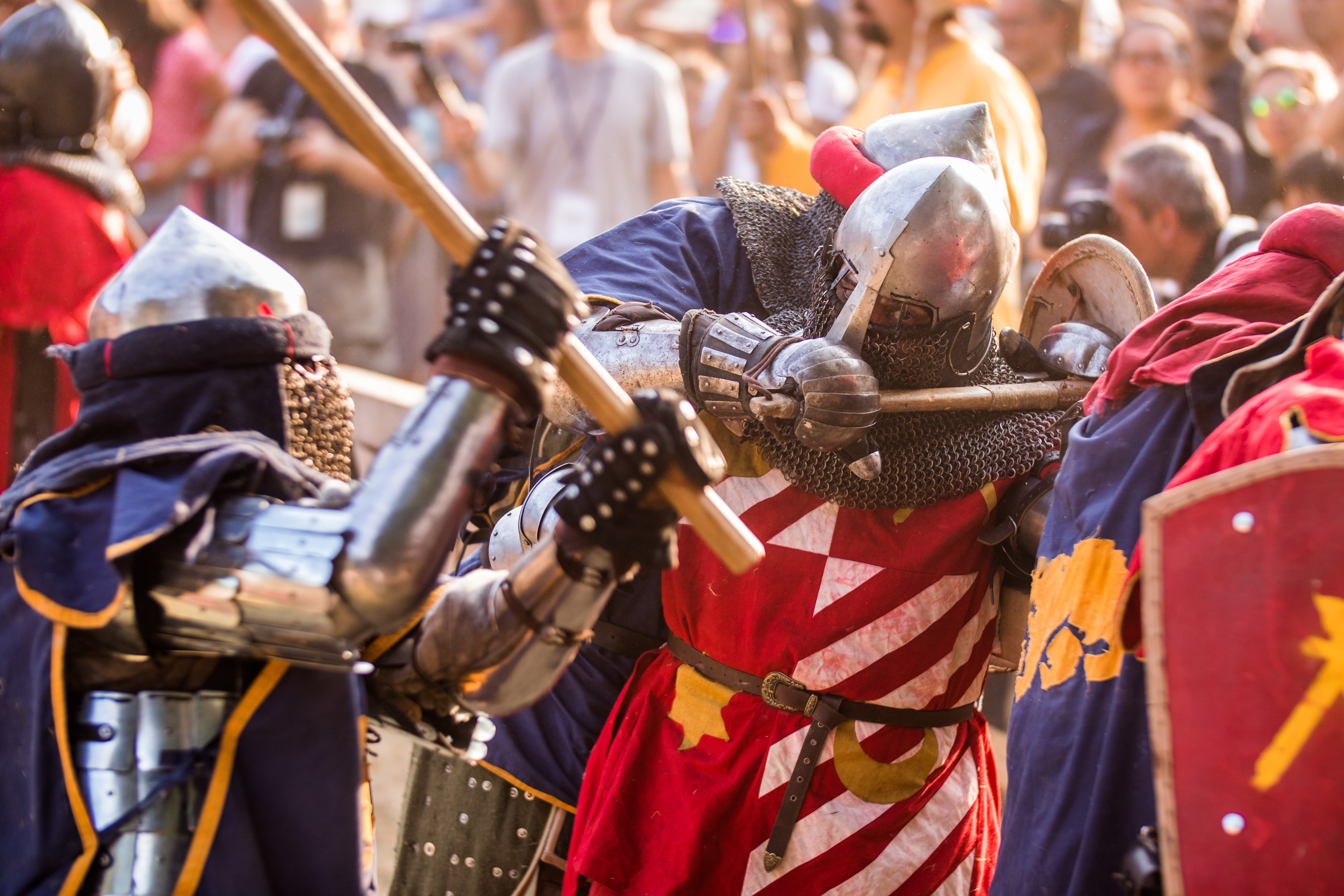
Mass battle

=== Mass categories ===
- "5 vs 5"
- "10 vs 10"
- "12 vs 12"
- "16 vs 16"
- "30 vs 30"
- Buhurts

The rules of mass battles are different, with teams trying to knock the opposing team on the ground to cause an out. The "kill zones" are the same, but the winner is the one who remains standing on their feet, hits are not counted. Legal strikes, throws, and grappling techniques are decided by the governing body. Mass categories are sometimes referred to as melees or buhurts.

In addition to these categories, there are some others, such as the "2 vs 2" which are held in the "deathmatch" mode: several two-member units meet on the lists, the battle is "all against all" and the winner is the two-member unit, of which at least one fighter is on his feet; "10 vs 10" and others. Armored combat categories often can be created for a specific festival, depending on its objectives and specific requirements of historicity, such as "7 vs 7" or the rare "150 vs 150" and "200 vs 200" category.

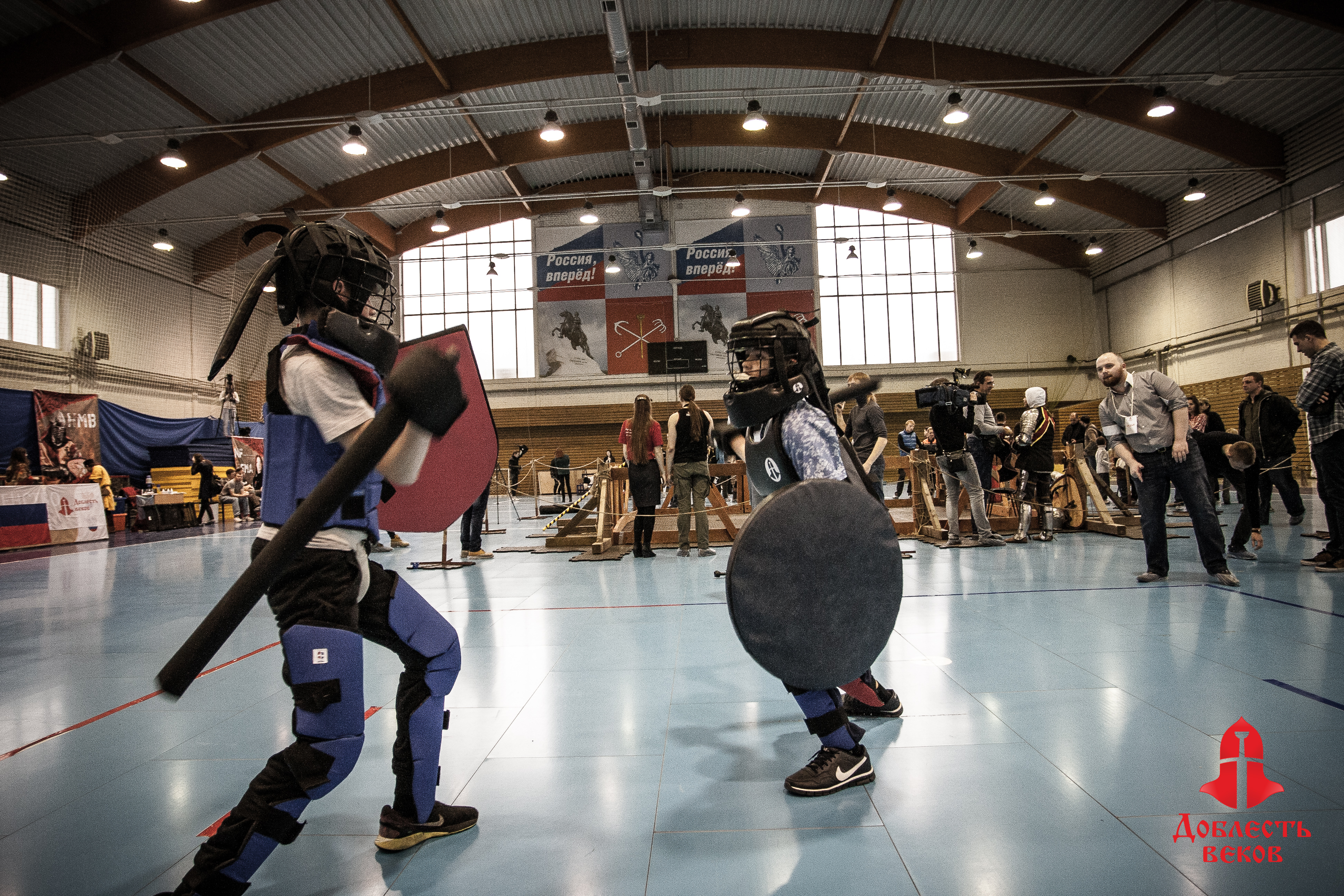
Children competing in duels "soft" format

=== "Soft" ===
"Soft" category, also called soft armored fighting (SAF), uses a safe model of a sword and shield made from padded non-metal materials, allowing for training and competitions, with similar rules as the other disciplines, but without metal armor. The category is primarily used, though not exclusively, for tournaments for athletes younger than 18, as well as for training without heavy armor, and for people interested in the sport but have not bought the expensive metal equipment.

== Training and preparation of fighters ==
Workouts are held in accordance with the most effective modern methods of training available in the martial arts. Buhurt fighters practice weight lifting, related martial arts, and cardiovascular exercise. Fighters often use the groundwork of other contact martial arts in their training practices. Sometimes, fighters will train using "soft" padded weapons instead of metal weapons, allowing for training without a metal suit of armor.

== Regulations ==
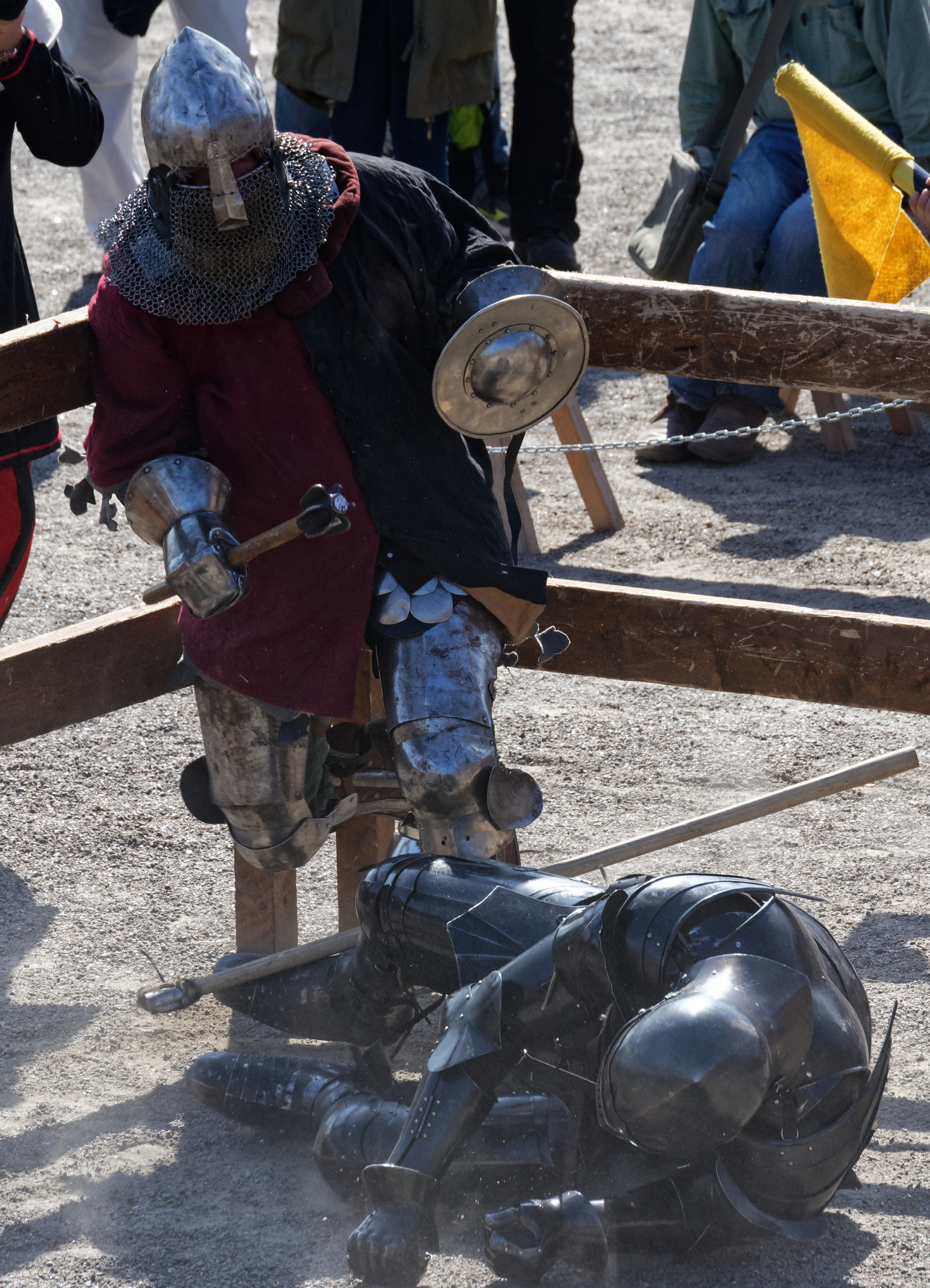
Downed knight

There are unified international rules for armored combat published by various governing bodies. They prohibit a number of very traumatic techniques, as well as regulate the admission of fighters, their weapons, and armor for safety, to prevent serious injuries, as well as for historical authenticity. Competitions in armored combat sporting events are refereed by referees called knight marshals who have special training and combat experience. In the past different countries used to have different fighting rules, the first unified rules were developed specifically for the world championship on armored combat, "Battle of the Nations". However, the rules used at a local tournament may still differ, for example it may be prohibited to deliver blows to certain areas such as below the knee, or elbow, but the international rating events are conducted in accordance with the accepted international rules for armored combat. Weapons are checked for correct measurements and safety before fighters enter the list. Due to the risks and injuries involved with the sport, participants must be over the age of 18 to participate, with the exception of the "soft" category events.

Armored combat regulates the appearance of weapons and armor to keep the appearance of historical accuracy through authenticity committee (AC) checks, in addition to the separate safety checks, being common at tournaments. This in contrast to Historical European Martial Arts (HEMA) that uses modern protective equipment such as a modern fencing helmet, padded fencing jacket, modern padded/heavy duty fencing gloves, hard plastic forearm and leg protection.

== Equipment ==
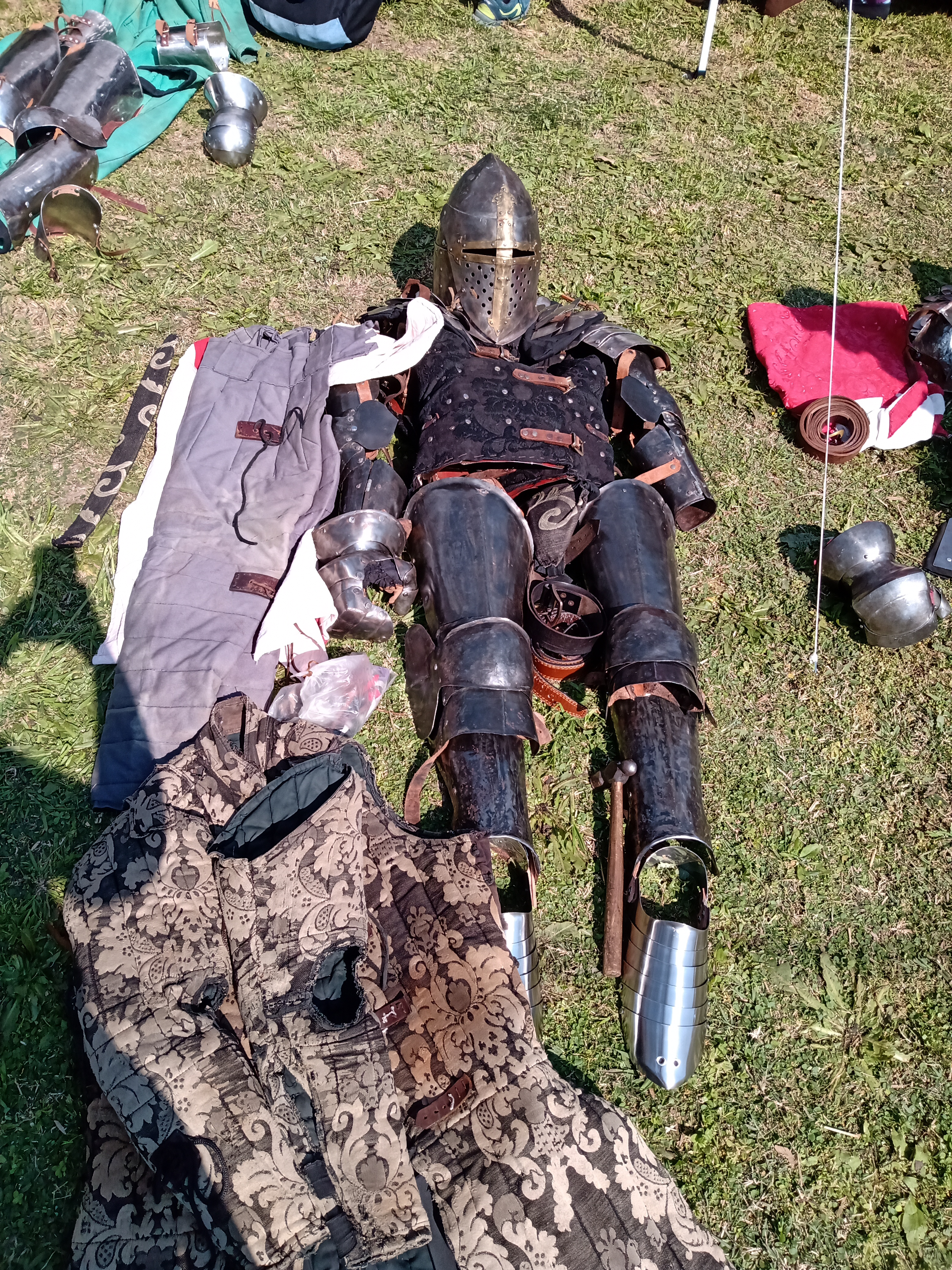
Buhurt armor kit example

Armored combat makes use of weapons and armor reminiscent of the medieval age, utilizing modern construction techniques specifically made for the sport of armored combat. Weapons and armor weight, sizes, aesthetics, materials, durability, and other metrics have to be within strict specification limits decided by governing bodies. For a full kit of armor and weapons can range from 2000-3000$ or more. The general recommendation is to first join and borrow equipment from the athlete's local armored combat club, and then later buy equipment based on local advice or even buying through the local club. Armored combat makes use of, but not limited to, weapons such as maces, longswords, arming sword, falchions, axes (both one handed and two handed varieties), bucklers, and shields. Armored components used, but not limited to, are gambeson, plate armour, brigandine, helmet, gauntlets, spaulders, sabatons, gorget, groin protector; all in various historical styles and aesthetics. There are specially made shoes designed to be aesthetically medieval made specifically to be used for armored combat competitions.

== See also ==
- Tournament (medieval)
- Jousting
- Harnischfechten, for the HEMA version of armored combat.
- Fencing
- Kendo
