= Tournament (medieval) =

Chivalrous competition or mock fight from the Middle Ages

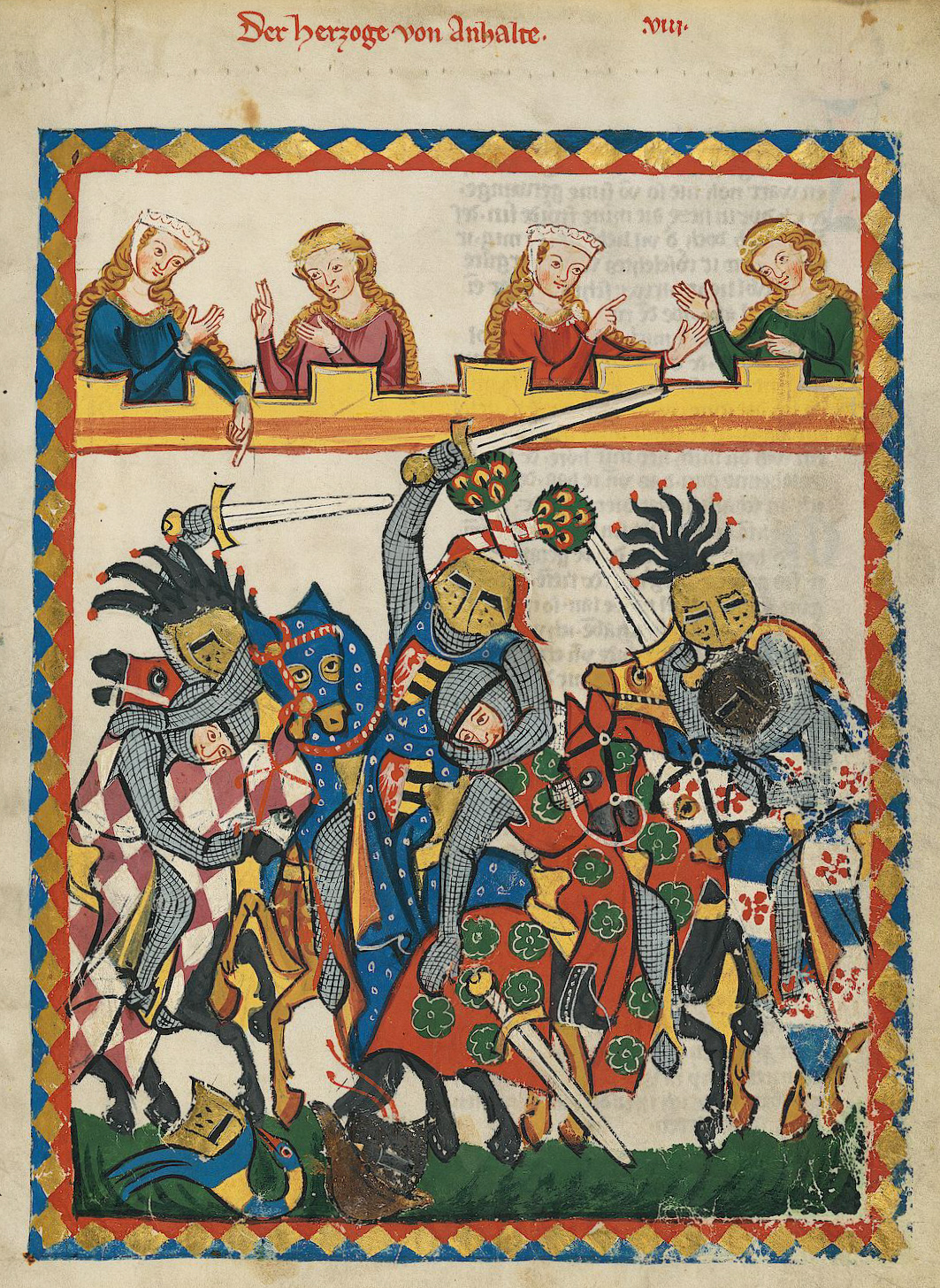
An early 14th century depiction of mounted combat in a tournament from the German Codex Manesse

A tournament, or tourney (from Old French torneiement, tornei), was a chivalrous competition or mock fight that was common in the Middle Ages and Renaissance (12th to 16th centuries). It is a type of hastilude.

Tournaments included mêlée, hand-to-hand combat, contests of strength or accuracy, and sometimes jousts. Some considered the tournaments to be frivolous pursuits of celebrity, and even a potential threat to public order; but the shows were popular and often put on in honor of coronations, marriages, births, recent conquests or peace treatises, or to welcome ambassadors, lords, or others considered to be of great importance. Other times tournaments were held for no particular reason or simply for entertainment.

== Etymology ==
The word tournament evolved from the Middle English tornement which entered the English lexicon from the Old French torneiement around the 12th century. That noun and its associated verb, tornoier, ultimately derive from the Latin tornare ("to turn") which also gave rise to the Italian torneo, the modern French tournoi, and modern English's tourney. Tournament and its derivates had been adopted in English (via Anglo-Norman) by the 14th century.

The Old French tornoier originally meant "to joust and tilt", but came to refer to the knightly tournament more generally while joster, meaning "approach, meet" (also adopted before the 14th century) came to refer to jousting specifically.

By the end of the 12th century, tornement and Latinized torneamentum had become the generic term for all kinds of knightly hastiludes or martial displays. Roger of Hoveden writing in the late 12th century defines torneamentum as "military exercises carried out, not in the knight's spirit of hostility (nullo interveniente odio), but solely for practice and the display of prowess (pro solo exercitio, atque ostentatione virium)."

== Origins ==
Medieval equestrian warfare and equestrian practices originate in Ancient Rome, just as the notion of chivalry goes back to the rank of equites in Roman times. There may be an element of continuity connecting the medieval tournament to the hippika gymnasia of the Roman cavalry, but with the sparsity of written records during the 5th to 8th centuries this is difficult to establish. It is known that such cavalry games were central to military training in the Carolingian Empire, with records of Louis and Charles' military games at Worms in 843. At this event which was recorded by Nithard, the initial chasing and fleeing was followed by a general mêlée of all combatants. In the Middle Ages (around the 11th–15th centuries), knights trained for war by fighting in tournaments. One popular event was the melee, where many knights fought each other at the same time using swords, maces, and shields while wearing full armour. Unlike jousting, which was one-on-one with lances on horses, melee involved teams or groups fighting together in an open arena.

Documentation of equestrian practice during the 9th to 10th centuries is sparse, but it is clear that the tournament was a development of the High Middle Ages. It is recognized by several medieval historical sources: a chronicler of Tours in the late 12th century attributes the "invention" of the knightly tournament to Angevin Baron Geoffroi de Preulli. In 16th-century German historiography, the setting down of the first tournament laws is attributed to Henry the Fowler; this tradition is cited by Georg Rüxner in his Thurnierbuch as well as by Paulus Hector Mair in his De Arte Athletica.

The earliest known use of the word "tournament" comes from peace legislation by Count Baldwin III of Hainaut for the town of Valenciennes, dated to 1114. It refers to the keepers of the peace in the town leaving it "for the purpose of frequenting javelin sports, tournaments and such like." A pattern of regular tournament meetings across northern France is evident in sources for the life of Charles, Count of Flanders. The sources of the 1160s and 1170s portray the event in the developed form it maintained into the 14th century.

== High Middle Ages ==
Tournaments centered on the mêlée, a general fight where the knights were divided into two sides and charged at each other, fighting with blunted weapons. Jousting, a single combat of two knights riding at each other, was a component of the tournament but was not its main feature.

The standard form of a tournament is evident in sources as early as the 1160s and 1170s, notably History of William Marshal and the Arthurian romances of Chrétien de Troyes. Tournaments might be held at all times of the year except the penitential season of Lent (the 40 days preceding Easter). The general custom was to hold them on Mondays and Tuesdays, though any day but Friday and Sunday might be used. The site of the tournament was customarily announced a fortnight before it was to be held. The most famous tournament fields were in northeastern France (including between Ressons-sur-Matz and Gournay-sur-Aronde near Compiègne, in use between the 1160s and 1240s) which attracted hundreds of foreign knights from all over Europe for the 'lonc sejor' (the tournament season).

Knights arrived individually or in companies to stay at one or other of the two settlements designated as their lodgings. The tournament began on a field outside the principal settlement, where stands were erected for spectators. On the day of the tournament one side was formed of those within the principal settlement, and another of those outside.

Parties hosted by the principal magnates present were held in both settlements, and preliminary jousts (called the vespers or premières commençailles) offered knights an individual showcase for their talents. On the day of the event, the tournament was opened by a review (regars) in which both sides paraded and called out their war cries. There was then a further opportunity for individual jousting carried out between the rencs, the two lines of knights. The opportunity for jousting at this point was customarily offered to the new, young knights who were present.

At some time in mid-morning the knights would line up for the charge (estor). At the signal which was usually a bugle or herald's cry, the two knights would ride at each other and meet with levelled lances. Those remaining on horseback would turn quickly (the action which gave the tournament its name) and single out knights to attack. There is evidence that squires were present at the lists (the staked and embanked line in front of the stands) to offer their masters up to three replacement lances. The mêlée would tend to degenerate into running battles between parties of knights seeking to take ransoms and would spread over several square miles between the two settlements which defined the tournament area. Most tournaments continued until both sides were exhausted or until the light faded. A few ended earlier, if one side broke in the charge, panicked and ran for its home base looking to get behind its lists and the shelter of the armed infantry which protected them. Following the tournament the patron of the day would offer lavish banquets and entertainment. Prizes were offered to the best knight on either side and awarded during the meals.

=== Melee ===
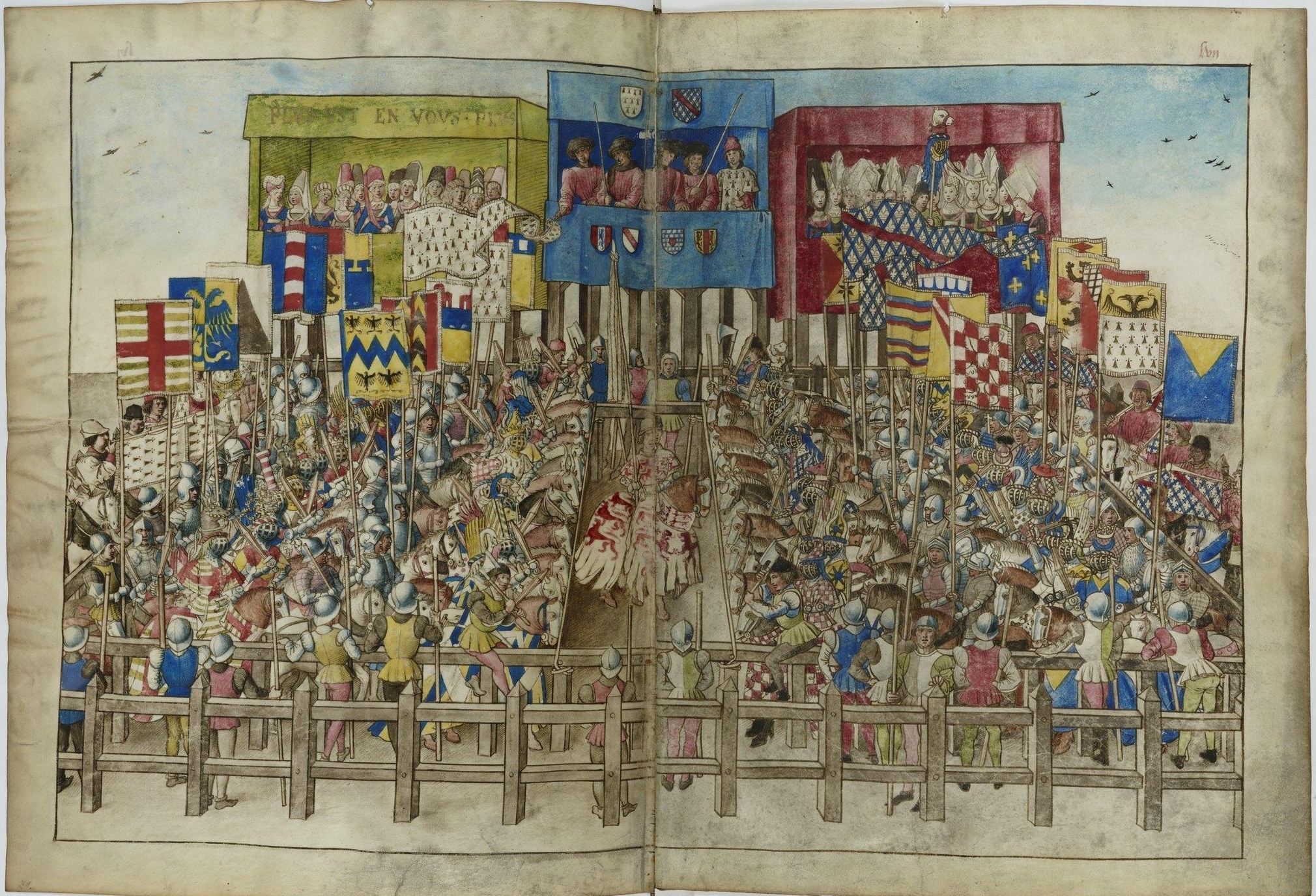
Two teams stand ready just before the match begins; each side has 24 knights, each with a banner-bearer. There is a central spectators' box for the four judges, and one on each side for the ladies; inscribed over the boxes is plus est en vous which is the motto of the Gruuthuse family of Bruges.

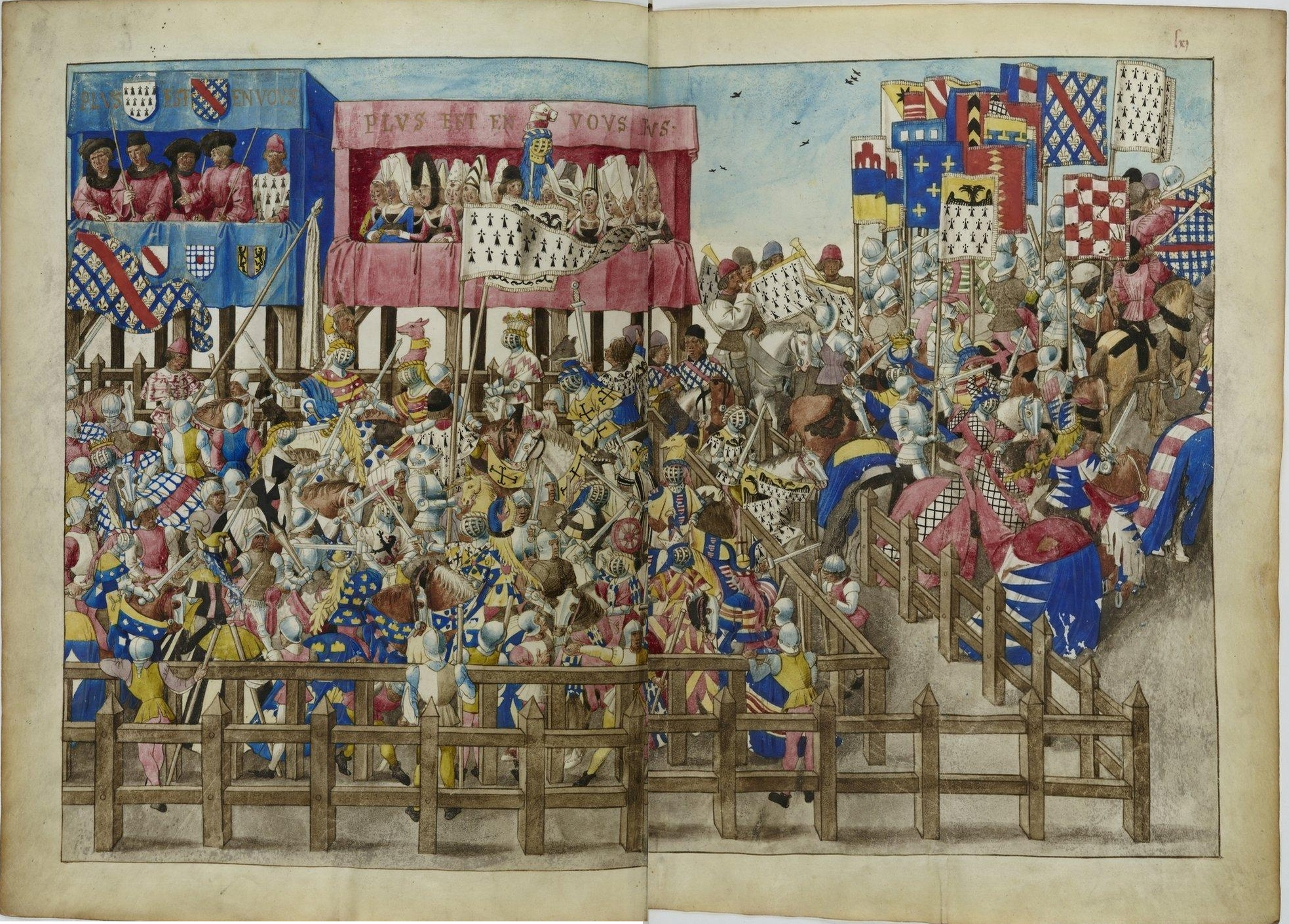
A tournament in progress (René d'Anjou), only the banners of Bourbon and Brittany are shown left in the field of view. The individual knights' banners are seen to the right.

Melee (/ˈmeɪleɪ/ or /ˈmeleɪ/, French: mêlée [mɛle]; in English frequently spelled as mêlée, melée, or simply melee) is a term for a type of mock combat in medieval tournaments. The "mêlée" was the "mass tournament" where two teams, either on foot or horse, clashed in formation. The aim was to smash into the enemy in massed formation, with the aim of throwing them back or breaking their ranks. Following a successful maneuver of this kind, the rank would attempt to turn around without breaking formation (widerkere or tornei); this action was so central that it would become eponymous of the entire tradition of the tourney or tournament by the mid-12th century. Weapons were often blunted before fights in order to prevent serious injury.

The Middle High German term for this type of contest was buhurt (adopted in French as bouhourt); some sources may also make a distinction between mêlée or mass tournament and buhurt, as the latter could refer to a wider class of equestrian games not necessarily confined to the formal tournament reserved to nobility.

The Old French meslee "brawl, confused fight; mixture, blend" (12th century) is the feminine past participle of the verb mesler "to mix" (ultimately from Vulgar Latin misculāta "mixed", from Latin miscēre "to mix"; compare mélange; meddle, medley). The modern French form mêlée was borrowed into English in the 17th century and is not the historical term used for tournament mock battles. The term buhurt may be related to hurter "to push, collide with" (cognate with English to hurt) or alternatively from a Frankish bihurdan "to fence; encompass with a fence or paling").

Tournaments often contained a mêlée consisting of knights fighting one another on foot or mounted, either divided into two sides or fighting as a free-for-all. The object was to capture opposing knights so that they could be ransomed, and this could be a very profitable business for such skilled knights as William Marshal.

The mêlée or buhurt was the main form of the tournament in its early phase during the 12th and 13th centuries. The joust, while in existence since at least the 12th century as part of tournaments, did not play the central role it would acquire later by the late 15th century.

=== Jousting ===
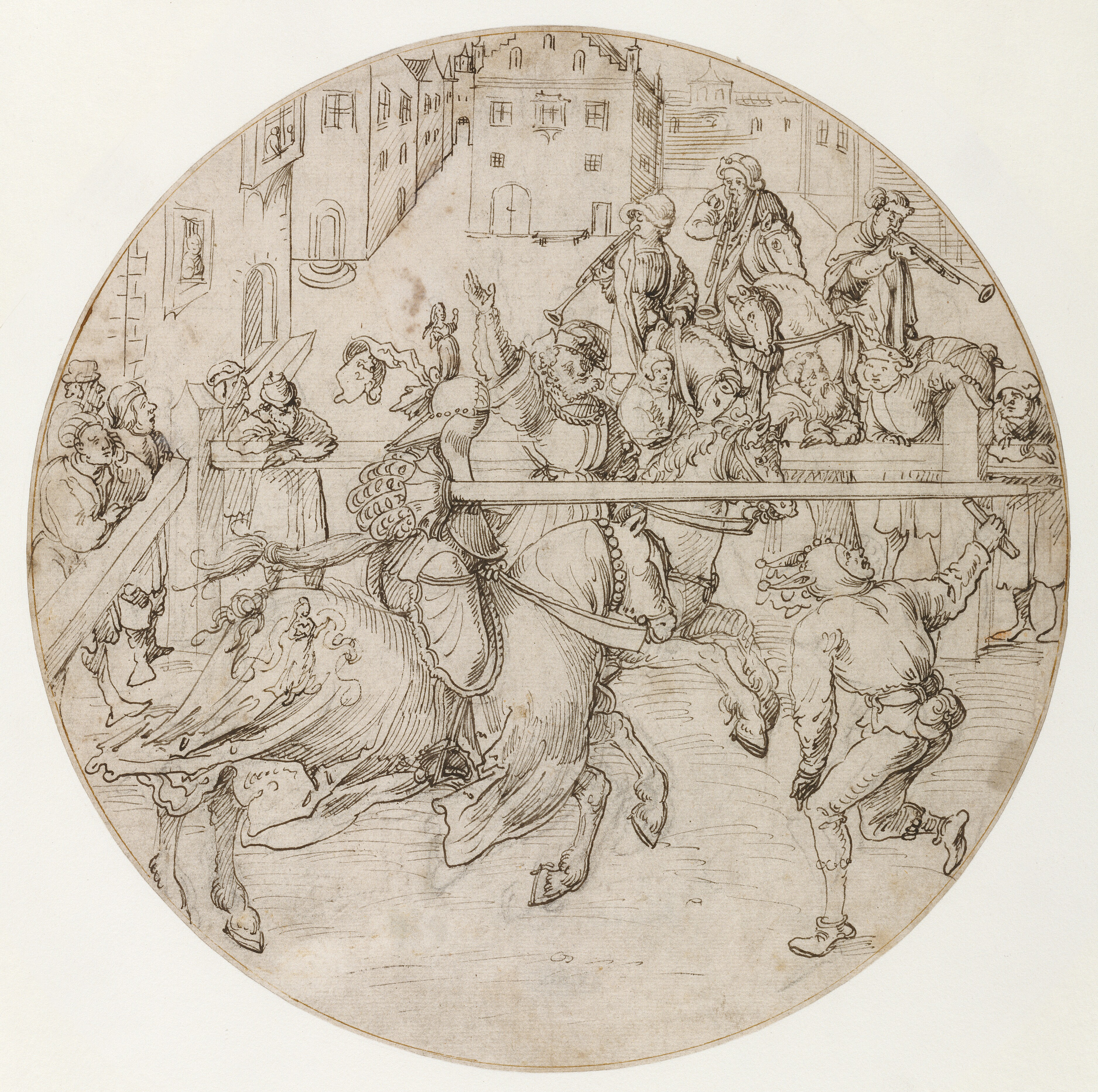
The joust outlasted the tournament proper and was widely practiced well into the 16th century (sketch by Jörg Breu the Elder, 1510).

Jousting formed part of the tournament event from as early a time as it can be observed. It was an evening prelude to the big day and was also a preliminary to the melee. In the 12th century, jousting was occasionally banned in tournaments. The reasons given are that it distracted knights from the main event and allowed a form of cheating. Count Philip of Flanders made a practice in the 1160s of turning up armed with his retinue to the preliminary jousts and then declining to join the mêlée until the knights were exhausted and ransoms could be swept up.

Jousting had its own devoted constituency by the early 13th century, and in the 1220s it began to have its own exclusive events outside the tournament. The biographer of William Marshal observed c.1224 that in his day noblemen were more interested in jousting than tourneying. In 1223, we have the first mention of an exclusively jousting event, the Round Table held in Cyprus by John d'Ibelin, lord of Beirut. Round Tables were a 13th-century enthusiasm and can be reconstructed to have been an elimination jousting event. They were held for knights and squires alike. Other forms of jousting also arose during the century, and by the 14th century the joust was poised to take over the vacancy in aristocratic amusement caused by the decline of the tournament.

=== Popularity ===
The first English mention of tourneying is in a charter of Osbert of Arden, Lord of Kingsbury of Warwickshire, which reveals that he travelled to both Northampton and London and crossed the English Channel to join in events in France. The charter dates to the late 1120s. The great tournaments of northern France attracted many hundreds of knights from Germany, England, Scotland, Occitania, and Iberia. There is evidence that 3,000 knights attended the tournament at Lagny-sur-Marne in November 1179 promoted by Louis VII in honour of his son's coronation. The state tournaments at Senlis and Compiègne held by Philip III in 1279 can be calculated to have been even larger events.

Aristocratic enthusiasm for the tournament meant that it had travelled outside its northern French heartland before the 1120s. The first evidence for it in England and the Rhineland is found in the 1120s. References in the Marshal biography indicate that in the 1160s tournaments were being held in central France and Great Britain. The contemporary works of Bertran de Born talk of a tourneying world that also embraced northern Iberia, Scotland and the Empire. The chronicle of Lauterberg indicates that by 1175 the enthusiasm had reached the borders of Poland.

Despite this huge interest and wide distribution, royal and ecclesiastical authority was deployed to prohibit the event. In 1130, Pope Innocent II at a church council at Clermont denounced the tournament and forbade Christian burial for those killed in them. The usual ecclesiastical justification for prohibiting them was that it distracted the aristocracy from more acceptable warfare in the defense of Christianity elsewhere. However, the reason for the ban imposed on them in England by Henry II was most likely because of its persistent threat to public order. Knights going to tournaments were accused of theft and violence against the unarmed. Henry was keen to re-establish public order in England after the disruption during the reign of King Stephen. He did not prohibit tournaments in his continental domains, and indeed three of his sons were avid pursuers of the sport.

Tournaments were allowed in England once again after 1192, when Richard I identified six sites where they would be permitted and gave a scale of fees by which patrons could pay for a license. But both King John and his son Henry III introduced fitful and capricious prohibitions which much annoyed the aristocracy and eroded the popularity of the events. In France, Louis IX prohibited tourneying within his domains in 1260, and his successors for the most part maintained the ban.

=== Equipment ===
It is a debated issue as to what extent specialized arms and armor were used in mêlée tournaments, and to what extent the military equipment of knights and their horses in the 12th and 13th centuries was devised to meet the perils and demands of tournaments, rather than warfare. It is, however, clear from the sources that the weapons used in tournaments were initially the same as those used in war. It is not certain that swords were blunted for most of the history of the tournament. This must have changed by the mid 13th century, at least in jousting encounters. There is a passing reference to a special spear for use in jousting in the Prose Lancelot (c. 1220). In the 1252 jousting at Walden, the lances used had sokets, curved ring-like punches instead of points. Edward I of England's Statute of Arms of 1292 says that blunted knives and swords should be used in tournaments.

== Late Middle and Early Modern Ages ==
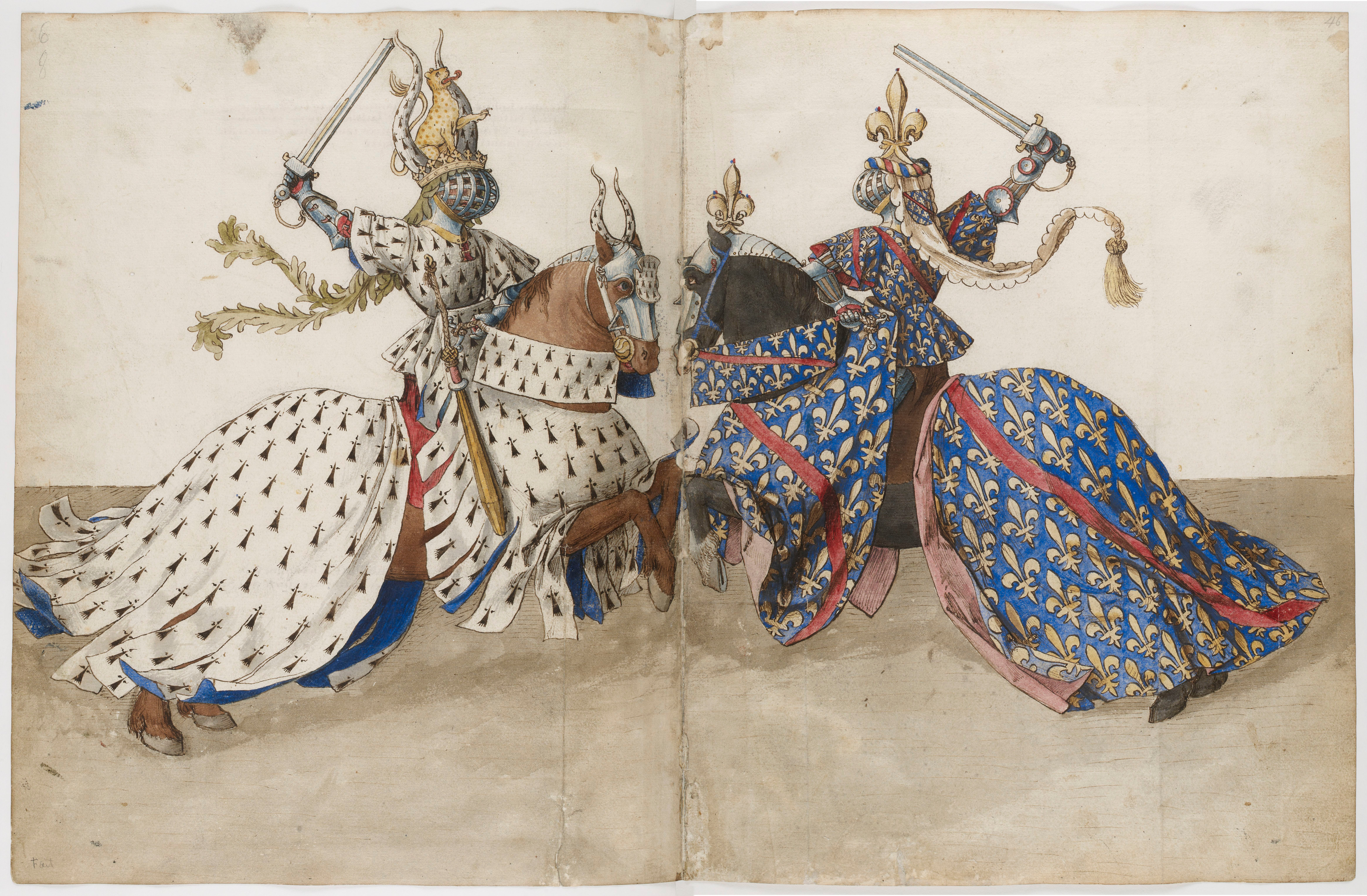
Watercolor, probably by Barthélemy d'Eyck, from King René's Tournament Book

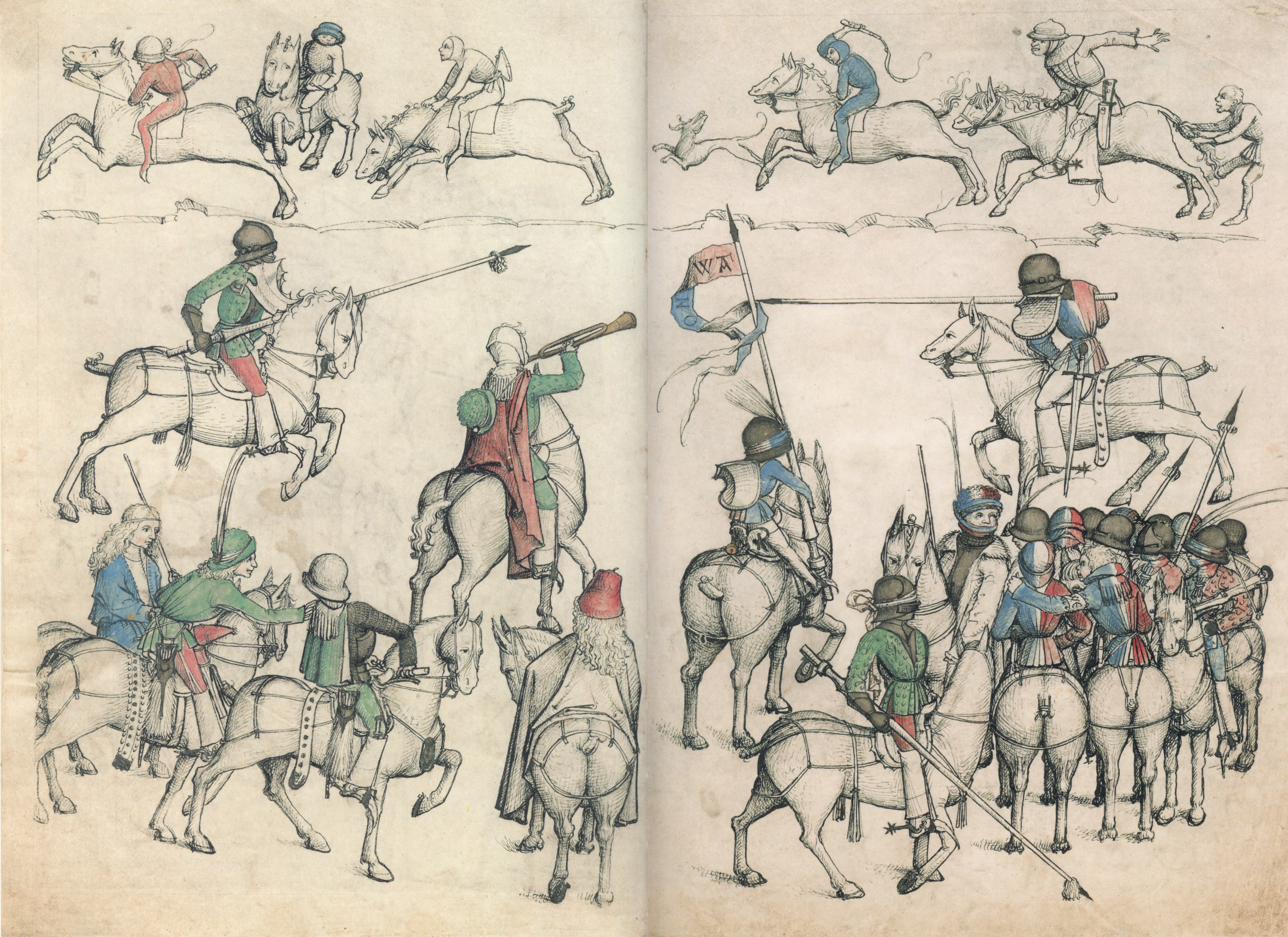
German Tournament ca. 1480, by the Master of the Housebook

The tournament had a resurgence of popularity in England in the reign of the martial and crusading King Edward I and under his grandson Edward III, yet the tournament died out in the latter's reign. Edward III encouraged the move towards pageantry and a predominance of jousting in his sponsored events. In one of the last true tournaments held in England (in 1342 at Dunstable), the mêlée was postponed so long by jousting that the sun was setting by the time the lines charged.

A tournament took place in Norwich in 1350 which was attended by Edward III's son, commonly known as the Black Prince. The tournament, held at the expense of the citizens of Norwich, cost £37.4s.6d.; approximately 5 years' wages for a skilled craftsman. The tournament survived little longer in France or Burgundy. The last known tournament at Bruges took place in 1379. That same year the citizens of Ghent rioted when the count of Flanders announced a tournament to be held at their city. The cause of their discontent was the associated expense to them.

By using costumes, drama, and symbolism tournaments became a form of art, which raised the expenses for these events considerably. They had political purposes: to impress the populace and guests with their opulence, as well as with the courage of the participants. Loyalty to a lord or lady was expressed through clothes and increasingly elaborate enactments. Tournaments also served cultural purposes. As the ideals of courtly love became more influential, women played a more important role in the events. Events often took place in honor of a lady, and ladies participated in the playacting and symbolism.

Edward III regularly held tournaments, during which people often dressed up, sometimes as the Knights of the Round Table. In 1331, the participants of one tournament wore green cloaks decorated with golden arrows. In the same year at a tournament at Cheapside, the king and other participants dressed as Tartars and led the ladies, who were in the colors of Saint George, in a procession at the start of the event. Edward III's grandson, Richard II, first distributed his livery badges with the White Hart at a tournament at Smithfield.

Mythology and storytelling were popular aspects of tournaments. In 1468 Duke Charles the Bold of Burgundy organised a tournament to celebrate his marriage with Margaret of York. The tournament was supposedly at the bidding of the 'Lady of the Hidden Ile'. A golden tree had been erected with all the coats of arms of the participating knights. They were dressed like famous figures from legend and history, while their squires were dressed as harlequins. A notable example of an elaborate costume was that of Anthony of Luxembourg: chained in a black castle he entered the lists; he could only be freed with a golden key and approval of the attending ladies.

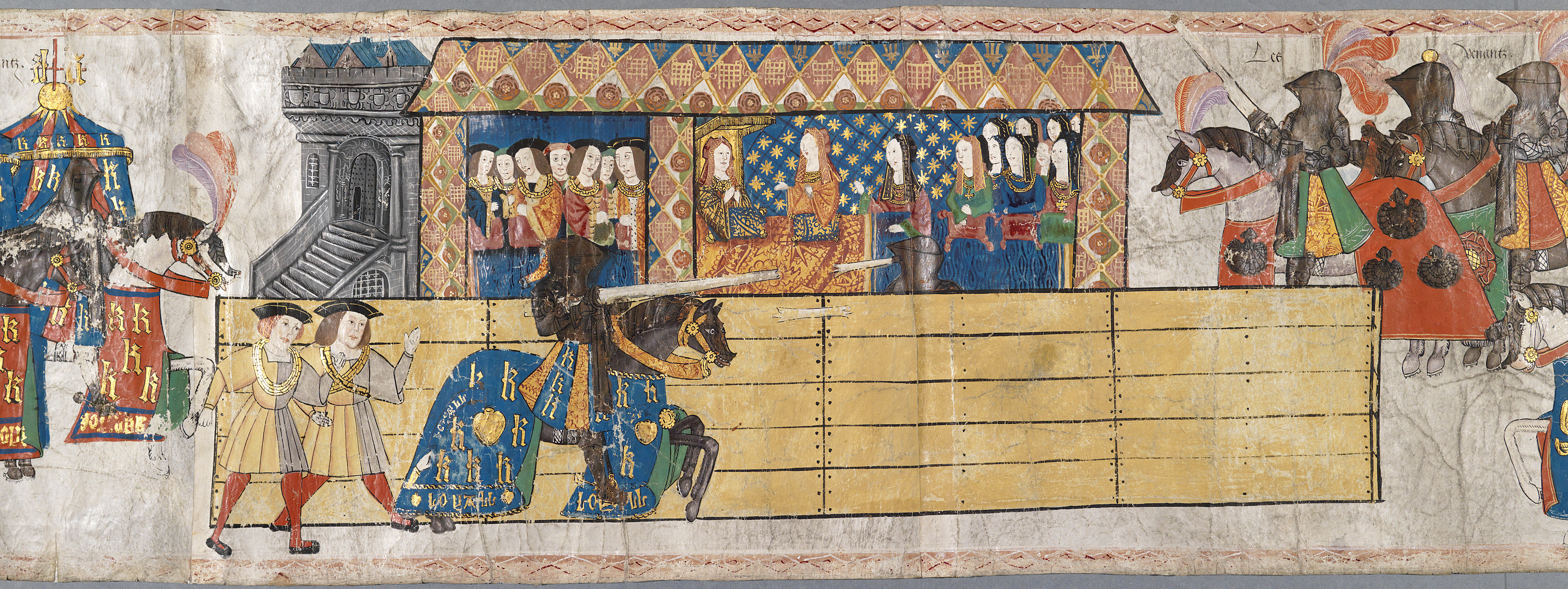
The 1511 Westminster Tournament Roll Detail showing Henry VIII in front of Catherine of Aragon

In Florence, the military aspect of the tournaments was secondary to the display of wealth. For a tournament honoring his marriage to Clarice Orsini in 1469, Lorenzo de' Medici had his standard designed by Leonardo da Vinci and Andrea del Verrocchio. He also wore a large amount of jewelry, including the Medici diamond 'Il Libro'.

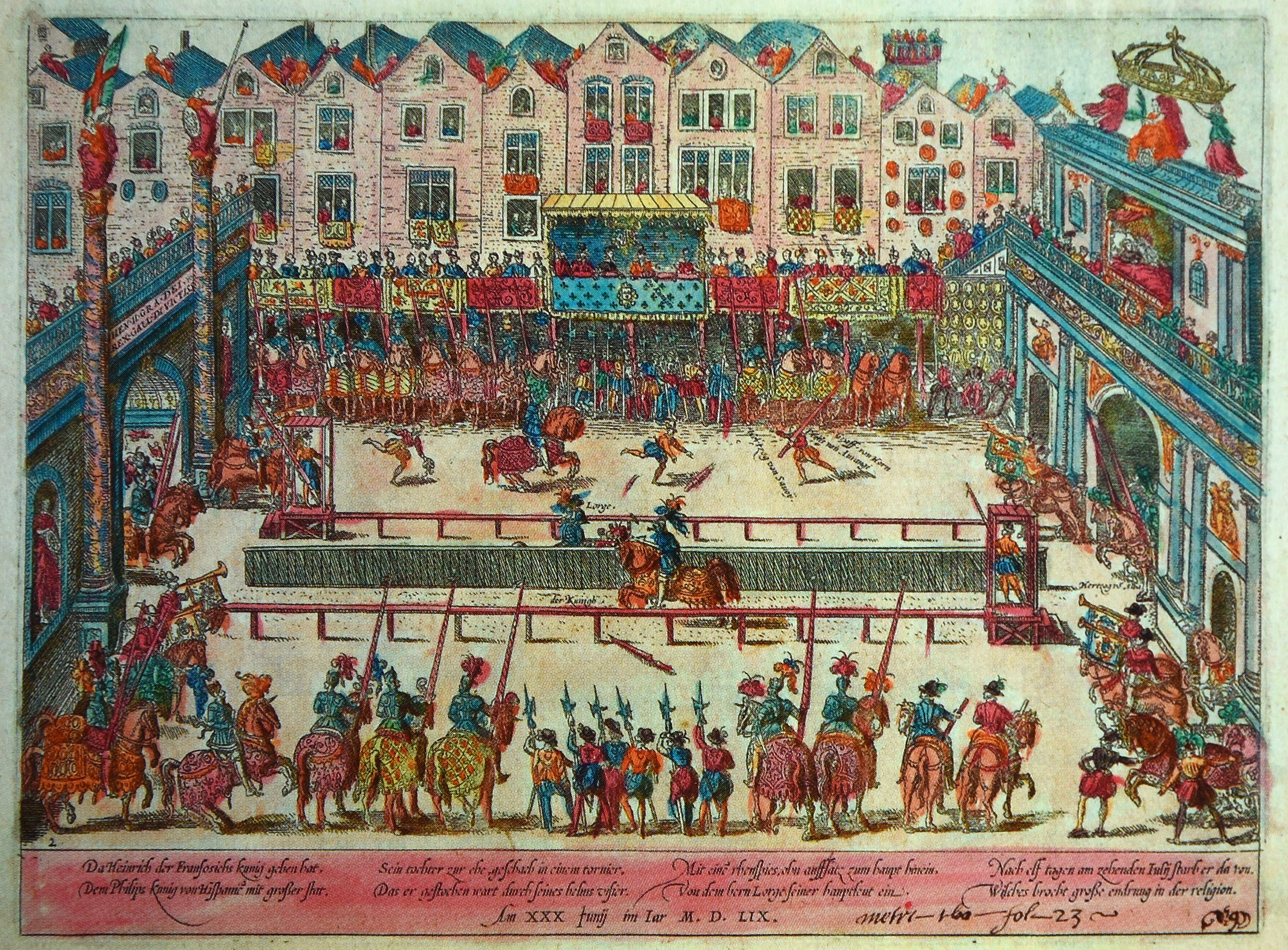
The fatal tournament between Henry II of France and Gabriel Montgomery (1559)

Royalty also held tournaments to stress the importance of certain events and their nobility's loyalty. King Henry VII of England and Queen Elizabeth of York presided over a series of tournaments when their infant son Henry VIII became duke of York in 1494. These tournaments were noted for their display of wealth. On the first day, the participants showed their loyalty by wearing the king's colors on their bodies and the queen's colors on their helmets. They further honored the royal family by wearing the colors of the king's mother, Margaret Beaufort, on the next day.

In 1511, at the court of King Henry VIII, a tournament was held in honor of the king's wife Catherine of Aragon. Charles Brandon came out of a tower which was moved onto the battlefield, dressed like a pilgrim. He only took off his pilgrim's clothes after the queen had given him permission to participate. In 1559, King Henry II of France died during a tournament when a sliver from the shattered lance of Gabriel Montgomery, captain of the Scottish Guard at the French Court, pierced his eye and entered his brain. The death caused his 15-year-old son Francis II to take the throne, beginning a period of political instability that ultimately led to the French Wars of Religion.

Spanish knights in the 16th century practised a team fight known as the "cane game". In Spanish Italy, tournaments could include an equivalent gioco de canne. The decline of the true tournament, as opposed to the joust, was not a straightforward process, although the word continued to be used for jousts until the 16th century - forced by the prominent place that tourneying occupied in popular Arthurian romance literature.

== See also ==
- Pas d'Armes
- Horses in the Middle Ages
- Knight
- Melee
- Armored combat (sport)
- Mock combat
- Hastilude
- Battle of the Nations
- Game of Cañas
- Historical European martial arts
- SCA armoured combat

== Bibliography ==
- J.R.V. Barker, The Tournament in England, 1100–1400 (Woodbridge, 1986) ISBN 0-85115-942-7
- R. Barber and J.R.V. Barker, Tournaments: Jousts, Chivalry and Pageants in the Middle Ages (Woodbridge, 1989)
- J. Bumke, Höfische Kultur: Literatur und Gesellschaft im hohen Mittelalter (Munich, 1986) English Translation by Thomas Dunlap: Courtly Culture: Literature and Society in the High Middle Ages, New York: overlook Duckworth, 2000, ISBN 0-7156-3273-6, section 4.3 "Tournaments".
- Louis Carolus-Barré, 'Les grand tournois de Compiègne et de Senlis en l'honneur de Charles, prince de Salerne (mai 1279)', Bullétin de la société nationale des antiquaires de France (1978/79)
- Crouch, D (2005), Tournament, London.
- Mortimer, Ian (2008), The Perfect King The Life of Edward III, Father of the English Nation, Vintage, pp. 88–89
- S. Muhlberger, Jousts and Tournaments: Charny and Chivalric Sport in the Fourteenth Century (Union City, Calif.:The Chivalry Bookshelf, 2003)
- ——— (2005), Deeds of Arms: Formal Combats in the Late Fourteenth Century, Highland Village, TX: The Chivalry Bookshelf.
- Murray, Alan V.; Watts, Karen, eds. (2020). The Medieval Tournament as Spectacle: Tourneys, Jousts and Pas d'Armes, 1100-1600. Woodbridge, UK: Boydell and Brewer. ISBN 9781783275427.
- S. Nadot, Rompez les lances ! Chevaliers et tournois au Moyen Age, Paris, editions Autrement, 2010. (Couch your lances! Knights and tournaments in the Middle Ages)
- E. van den Neste, Tournois, joutes, pas d'armes dans les villes de Flandre à la fin du moyen âge, 1300–1486 (Paris, 1996)
- M. Parisse, 'Le tournoi en France, des origines à la fin du xiii^{e} siècle, in, Das ritterliche Turnier in Mittelalter: Beitrage zu einer vergleichenden Formentund verhallengeschichte des Rittertum, ed. J. Fleckenstein (Göttingen, 1985)
- J. Vale, Edward III and Chivalry: Chivalric Society and its Context, 1270–1350 (Woodbridge, 1983).
