= Botnen =

Botnen is Norwegian (Nynorsk) for "the bottom"; it commonly refers to the inner end of a fjord system or glacial valley. The name may refer to the following locations:

- Botnen, Fjaler, a village in Fjaler municipality in Vestland county, Norway
- Botnen, Nordland, a village in Steigen municipality in Nordland county, Norway
- Botnen, Ullensvang, a village in Ullensvang municipality in Vestland county, Norway

== See also ==
- Botn (disambiguation)
