= Battle of the Nations (modern tournament) =

International historical medieval battles event

External videos
- «Battle of the nations 2012»(promo)

The Battle of the Nations was an international armored combat sport world championship series, first held in 2009, in Khotyn, Ukraine and held in Europe, in April, every year until the 2020 and 2021 events were cancelled due to the COVID-19 pandemic, and in 2022 cancelled due to the Russian invasion of Ukraine.

It is a full contact competition using metal weapons and a standardized list of rules. National teams compete in several standard events, with all being full contact - no stage reenactment battles are included.

Teams from up to 60 countries have entered the tournaments.

== History ==
The first meeting for the organization of the festival and the championship was held in Kharkiv, Ukraine in 2009. Its participants, captains of the first national teams, came to a consensus concerning how to hold the event. Since the rules could vary in different countries and even in different regions of one country, they also agreed of a set of unified international rules for the conduct of battles.

The first "Battle of the Nations" event was held in 2010 in the Khotyn Fortress (Ukraine). It was attended by the national teams of four countries: Russia, Ukraine, Belarus and Poland. Russia won most of the first places. The program included three categories: a duel (1 vs 1), group battles (5 vs 5) and mass battles (21 vs 21). For those who were not members of the national teams, but came to support the comrades, there were non-security buhurts.

The second event, in 2011, was also held at the Khotyn Fortress. Seven national teams participated; the previous four and three novice teams: Italy, Germany and Quebec. Two more categories were added to the three classic ones, namely the “professional fight” and “all vs all”. The latter category allows participants who are not members of the national teams to fight for their countries. The first places were won by Russia. The festival was attended by about 30,000 spectators and a documentary about the life of the participants was shot.

The 2012 event, the third held, was in Warsaw, Poland, and included representatives of twelve countries. A feature of the festival were battles of mounted knights, that were included in the program of the traditionally on-foot world championship in HMB for the first time. The top four teams were Russia, Ukraine, Poland, and USA.

The 2013 event, the fourth, was held in Aigues-Mortes, France. Twenty-two teams from Europe, the Americas, and the Pacific Rim took part. With the increase in teams, there were no "pro rules" fights or mounted jousting in the main arena. The top four teams were Russia, Ukraine, Belarus, and USA.

In 2014, due to the dissatisfaction of some of its members with the HMBIA, the organisers of the Battle of the Nations, some member states went on to create the International Medieval Combat Federation.

The 2014 event was the fifth held, and was in Trogir, Croatia. Around 30 countries were expected.

The 2015 event was the sixth held, and was held in Prague.

The 2016 even was the seventh held, and was also held in Prague. 35 countries were expected.

The 2017 event was the eighth, and was held in Barcelona, Spain and was the first year that the Chinese, Brazilian and Turkish team joined Battle of the Nations.

The 2018 event was the ninth, and was held in Rome, Italy.

The 2019 event was the 10th held, and was held in the Smederevo Fortress, in Smederevo, Serbia.

The 2020 and 2021 events were cancelled due to the COVID-19 pandemic, the 2022 tournament was cancelled due to the Russian invasion of Ukraine.

In 2024 HMB Russian national governing body after having been alienated from the rest of the international buhurt community, would create a replacement for Battle of Nations, an ongoing tournament series called HMB Russia Fest in Vyborg, Russia, attended by Russian and allied athletes.

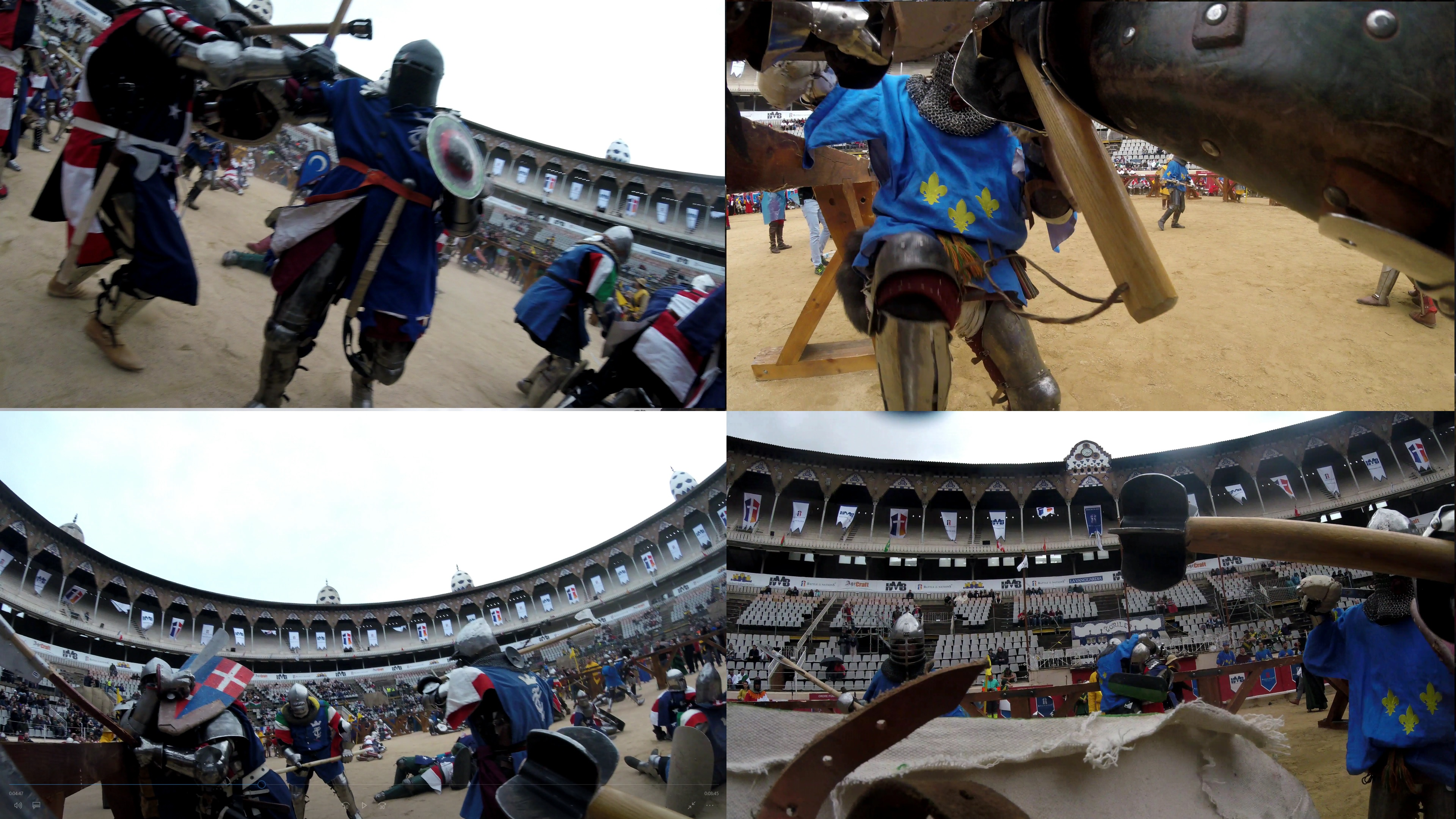
Mass battle 2017 21 vs. 21 at La Monumental, in Barcelona, Spain .

== Main provisions ==
National teams of different countries compete at “Battle of the Nations”. Under the rules of BN, a national team has to consist of at least 8 and a maximum of 50 fighters. Any representative of any of the historical medieval battles (HMB) clubs, as well as an individual fighter, provided they have gone through a selection process conventional for a country, can become a member of a national team.

Qualifying tournaments are competitions, where battles are held in accordance with the unified international rules for the historical medieval battle. National teams organize qualifying tournaments to find the best HMB fighters of a country. The unified international rules, according to which battles are held, have been written especially for "Battle of the Nations”. Before the unified rules were written, the countries had different HMB rules.

The tradition for this combat/competition has largely come from Russia, where enthusiasts have held previous events where full contact "battles" of large numbers of armoured combatants, are held, often in historical sites. The emphasis is put on the combatants wearing historically accurate equipment and heraldry, and the use of appropriate weapons for the combat.

The heraldry, however, reflects the modern competition teams, rather than necessarily historically correct heraldic device that may have been worn by combatants in the medieval period. The first tournament was held at the Khotyn Fortress in Ukraine in 2010. The combatants depict armoured fighters from the 12th - 15th century. A number of different forms of combat take place, including some involving individuals, 5 a side or 21 on each side. Over 200 armoured men at arms take place in the competition, and in addition to melee/hand-to-hand weapons, archery is also featured.

Team Quebec (also known at Ost du Quebec) was the first non-European team to enter the tournament in Ukraine in 2011. Their captain put a team together of 9 fighters and 3 support staff who traveled from Montreal Quebec to take part in the tournament. They also held the first friendly tournament under the HMB rules in St-Eustache in February 2012 where participants from Ontario and USA took part.

US combatants entered a team for the first time in 2012, with a number of their members coming from the Society for Creative Anachronism. The US team is a cross-group association of historic martial arts organizations.

"Battle of the Nations 2012" gathered participants from 12 countries.

By the following year, that number increased to 22 teams which participated in the "Battle of the Nations 2013", which was held in Aigues-Mortes in southern France. This was the first time the event was held outside east Europe.

"Battle of the Nations 2014" took place on 12 June in Trogir, Croatia. This was the year of the first female official nomination in the fencing "Triathlon". An innovation for the championship.

"Battle of the Nations 2015" was held in Prague, Czech Republic, 7–10 May. The women's buhurt category: all vs all - was promoted to be the innovation for that year's championship.

List of participants (Sorted by first-year participation):

2010 — Russia, Ukraine, Belarus, Poland 2011 - Germany, Italy, Quebec 2012 - Austria, United States, Israel, Denmark, The Baltic States- union of Lithuania, Latvia, Estonia 2013 - Argentina, Australia, Belgium, Czech Republic & Slovakia, France, Japan,Luxembourg, New Zealand, Spain, United Kingdom Fighters from Portugal also attended, and fought with the Luxembourg team. 2014 - Chile, Netherlands, Finland, Switzerland, Mexico.

About 25,000 attend the event annually.

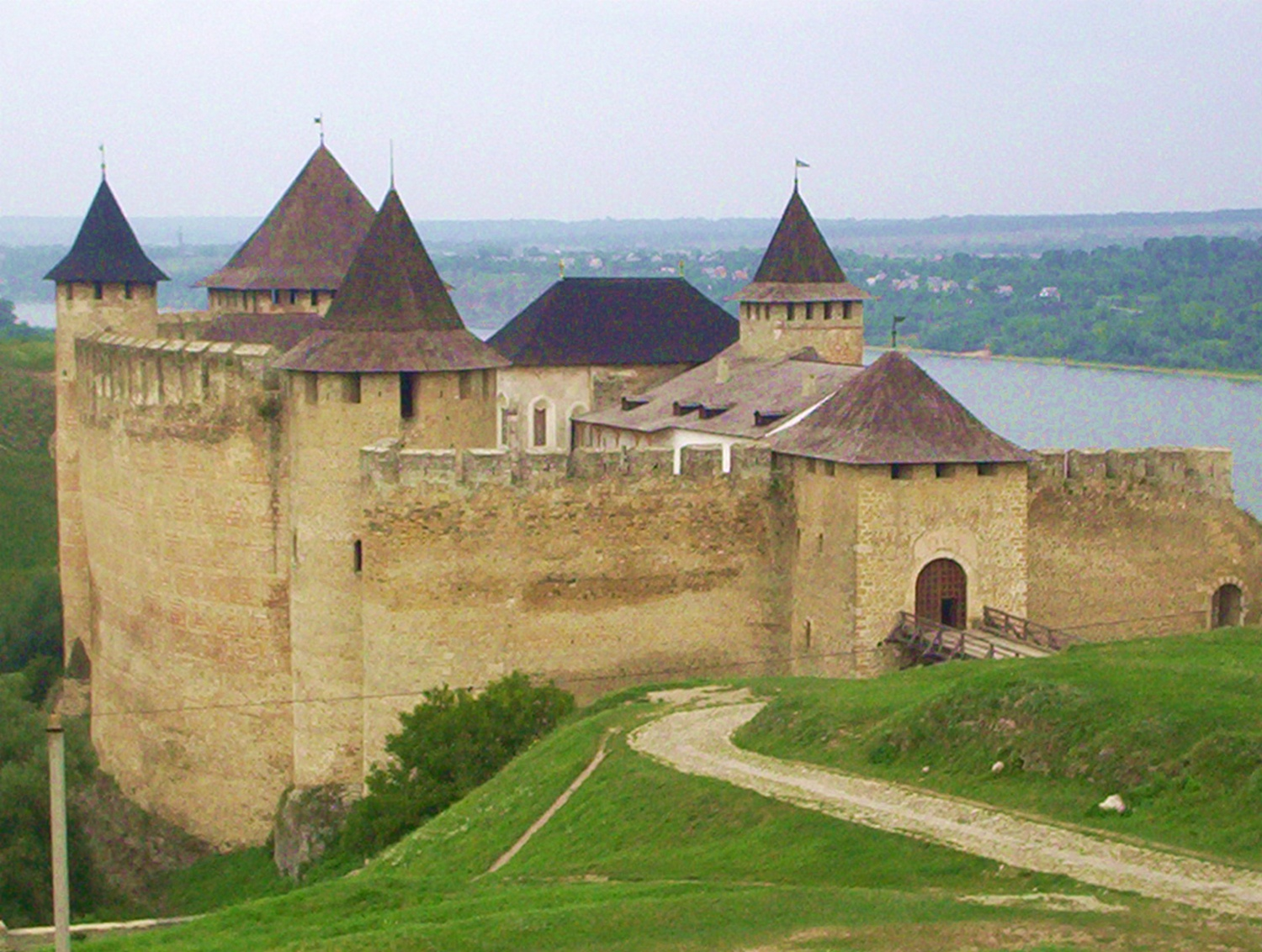
View of the Khotyn Fortress's entrance.

== List of host cities by year ==
- 2025 Visegrad Palace, in Hungary
- 2019 Smederevo Fortress, in Smederevo, Serbia
- 2018 Santa Severa, in Rome, Italy
- 2017 La Monumental, in Barcelona, Spain
- 2016 Petrin Hill, in Prague, Czech Republic
- 2015 Petrin Hill, in Prague, Czech Republic
- 2014 in Trogir, Croatia
- 2013 Aigues-Mortes, in Gard, France
- 2012 in Warsaw, Poland
- 2011, Khotyn Fortress, in Chernivtsi Oblast, Ukraine
- 2010, Khotyn Fortress in Chernivtsi Oblast, Ukraine

== Medals ==
=== BoN 2010 in Khotyn Fortress, in Chernivtsi Oblast, Ukraine standings ===
Male category “Triathlon Duel” 1vs1.
1. Sergey Ukolov, Russia
2. Mikhail Babynin, Russia
3. Franck de Gouil, France

Category “Group Battles” 5vs5.
1. Russia 1
2. Ukraine 1
3. France 1

Category “Mass Battles” 21vs21.
1. Russia
2. France
3. Belarus

=== BoN 2011 in Khotyn Fortress, in Chernivtsi Oblast, Ukraine standings ===
Male category “Triathlon Duel” 1vs1.
1. Sergey Ukolov, Russia
2. Ivan Vasilev, Russia
3. Aleksandr Nadezhdin, Russia

Category “Group Battles” 5vs5.
1. Russia 1
2. Russia 2
3. Russia 3

Category “Mass Battles” 21vs21.
1. Russia
2. Ukraine
3. Belarus

=== BoN 2012 in Khotyn Fortress, in Chernivtsi Oblast, Ukraine standings ===
Male category “Triathlon Duel” 1vs1.
1. Sergey Ukolov, Russia
2. Marcin Waszkielis, Poland
3. Alexey Petrik, Russia

Category “Group Battles” 5vs5.
1. Russia 1
2. France
3. Poland

Category “Mass Battles” 21vs21. 1. Russia
2. Ukraine
3. France

=== BoN 2013 in Warsaw, Poland standings ===
Full Standings of 2013

Male category “Duel” 1vs1.
1. Sergei Ukolov, Russia
2. Evgenii Lapik, Russia
3. Krzysztof Szatecki, Poland

Category “Group Battles” 5vs5.
1. Russia 1
2. Russia 2
3. Russia 3

Category “Mass Battles” 21vs21.
1. Russia
2. Ukraine
3. Belarus

=== BoN 2014 in Trogir, Croatia standings ===
Full Standings of 2014

Male category “Duel” 1vs1.
1. Sergey Ukolov, Russia
2. Alexeey Petrik, Russia
3. Evgenij Lapik, Russia

Female category “Duel” 1vs1.
1. Tatiana Guseva, Russia
2. Gulina Kokhvakko, Russia
3. Yana Zabolotnikova, Russia

Category “Group Battles” 5vs5.
1. Russia
2. Russia
3. France

Category “Mass Battles” 21vs21.
1. Russia
2. Ukraine
3. Belarus

=== BoN 2015 in Petrin Hill, in Prague, Czech Republic standings ===
Full Standings of 2015

Male category “Duel” 1vs1.
1. Yevgeny Lapik, Russia 3
2. Sergei Ukolov, Russia 1
3. Alexeey Petrik, 2

Female category “Duel” 1vs1.
1. Galina Kokhvakko, Russia 2
2. Christelle Carbeaud, France
3. Yana Zabolotnikova, Russia 3

Category Polearm “Duel” 1vs1.
1. Aleksei Naiderov, Russia
2. Mikhail Morgulis, Israel
3. Egor Tomassin, France

Category “Group Battles” 5vs5.
1. Russia 1
2. Ukraine 1
3. France 2

Category “Mass Battles” 21vs21.
1. Russia
2. Ukraine
3. France

=== BoN 2016 in Petrin Hill, in Prague, Czech Republic standings ===
Full Standings of 2016

Male category “Duel” 1vs1.
1. Aleksey Petrik, Russia, Fighter 2
2. Sergey Ukolov, Russia, Fighter 1
3. Aleksandr Nadezhdin, Russia, Fighter 3

Female category “Duel” 1vs1.
1. Galina Kohvakko, Russia, Fighter 1
2. Denise Brinkmann, Germany, Fighter 1
3. Marina Golovina, Russia, Fighter 3

Male Category Polearm “Duel” 1vs1.
1. Evgeniy Baranov, Belarus
2. Jeff Galli, USA
3. Aleksey Nayderov, Russia

Female Category Polearm “Duel” 1vs1.
1. Ekaterina Obade, Moldova
2. Olga Grabovskaya, Ukraine
3. Alina Abdullaeva, Russia

Female Category “Group Battles” 3vs3.
1. Ukraine
2. Russia
3. France

Category “Group Battles” 5vs5.
1. Russia 1
2. Ukraine 1
3. Russia 3

Category “Mass Battles” 21vs21.
1. Russia
2. Ukraine
3. Belarus

=== BoN 2017 in La Monumental, in Barcelona, Spain standings ===
Male category “Sword and Shield” 1vs1.
1. Alexey Petrik, Russia
2. Robert Szatecki, Poland
3. Lukas Kowal, UK

Female category “Sword and Shield” 1vs1.
1. Galina Kohvakko, Russia
2. Maya Olchak, Poland
3. Martina Ravarini, Italy

Male Category Polearm "Duel” 1vs1.
1. Evgeny Ageev, Russia
2. Jose Abuedo, Spain
3. Evgeny Baranov, Belarus

Male category “Sword and Buckler” 1vs1.
1. Ilya Ivanov, Russia
2. Krzysztof Szatecki, Poland
3. Konstantin Nataluha, Ukraine

Male category “Triathlon Duel” 1vs1.
1. Alexey Petrik, Russia
2. Sergey Ukolov, Russia
3. Ilya Ivanov, Russia

Female category “Triathlon Duel” 1vs1.
1. Galina Kohvakko, Russia
2 .Maria Davydova, Russia
3. Irina Ilnitskaya, Ukraine

Category “Group Battles” 5vs5.
1. Russia 1
2. Russia 2
3. Russia 3

Category “Mass Battles” 21vs21.
1. Ukraine
2. Russia
3. France

=== BoN 2018 in Santa Severa, in Rome, Italy standings ===
Male category “Sword and Shield” 1vs1.
1. Alexey Petrik, Russia
2. Marcin Waszkielis, Poland
3. Matthieu Bakto, France

Female category “Sword and Shield” 1vs1.
1. Galina Kohvakko, Russia
2. Agnieszka Lasota, Poland
3. Denise Töpfer, Germany

Male Category Polearm "Duel” 1vs1.
1. Evgeny Ageev, Russia
2. Evgeny Baranov, Belarus
3. Sergey Moroz, Ukraine

Female Category Polearm "Duel” 1vs1.
1. Olga Grabovskaya, Ukraine
2. Lisa Galli, USA
3. Alina Abdullaeva, Russia

Male category “Sword and Buckler” 1vs1.
1. Ilya Ivanov, Russia
2. Konstyantyn Natalukha, Ukraine
3. Robert Szatecki, Poland

Female category “Sword and Buckler” 1vs1.
1. Ksenia Vjunova, Russia
2. Irina Ilnitskaya, Ukraine
3. Esther Veldstra, Netherlands

Male category Longsword “Duel” 1vs1.
1. Sergey Ukolov, Russia
2. Krzysztof Szatecki, Poland
3. Alexandr Vasilinich, Ukraine

Female category Longsword “Duel” 1vs1.
1. Coline Marod, France
2. Olga Grabovskaya, Ukraine
3. Malgorzata Zeblinska, Poland

Male category “Triathlon Duel” 1vs1.
1. Alexey Petrik, Russia
2. Henri Depal, France
3. Ilya Ivanov, Russia

Female category “Triathlon Duel” 1vs1. 1. Galina Kokhvakko, Russia
2. Anastasia Mesheriakova, Russia
3. Coline Marod, France

Male category “PROFIGHTS” U75 1vs1.
1. Vyacheslav Levakov, Russia
2. Grigoriy Chaploutskiy, Ukraine
3. Marcin Janiszewski, Poland

Male category "PROFIGHTS” 75-85 1vs1.
1. Lukas Kowal, UK
2. Robert Szatecki, Poland
3 .Maxim Slavchenko, Russia

Male category “PROFIGHTS” 85-95 1vs1.
1. Ilya Dragan, Moldova
2. Franck de Gouil, France
3. Konstyantyn Natalukha, Ukraine

Male category “PROFIGHTS” O95 1vs1.
1. Alexey Petrik, Russia
2. Krzysztof Szatecki, Poland
3. Ivan Tyutyunnik, Ukraine

Male Category “Group Battles” 5vs5.
1. Russia 1
2. Russia 2
3. Russia 3

Female Category “Group Battles” 5vs5.
1. Russia
2. France
3. HMBIA 3

Category “Mass Battles” 21vs21.
1. Russia
2. Ukraine
3. France

=== BoN 2019 in Smederevo Fortress, in Smederevo, Serbia standings ===
Male category “Sword and Shield” 1vs1.
1. Alexey Petrik, Russia
2. Marcin Waszkielis, Poland
3. Lukas Kowal, UK

Female category “Sword and Shield” 1vs1.
1. Alina Lappo, Russia
2. Agnieszka Lasota, Poland
3. Melanie Gras, Germany

Male Category Polearm "Duel” 1vs1.
1. Yaroslav Rusanov, Russia
2. Mihal Bednarski, Poland
3. Kang Lu, China1

Female Category Polearm "Duel” 1vs1.
1. Olga Grabovskaya, Ukraine
2. Alina Abdullaeva, Russia
3. Maja Celińska, Poland

Male category “Sword and Buckler” 1vs1.
1. Ilya Ivanov, Russia
2. Grigoriy Chaploutskiy, Ukraine
3. Bohumil Masnicak, UK

Female category “Sword and Buckler” 1vs1.
1. Maria Davydova, Russia
2. Aleksandra Soloshenko, Kazakhstan
3. Aleksandra Sokolsky, Ukraine

Male category Longsword “Duel” 1vs1. 1. Sergey Ukolov, Russia
2. Alexander Vasilinich, Ukraine
3. Vladimirs Maksimenko, Latvia

Female category Longsword “Duel” 1vs1.
1. Anastasia Mesheriakova, Russia
2. Olga Grabovskaya, Ukraine
3. Sigrid Karlsson, Sweden

Male category “Triathlon Duel” 1vs1.
1. Alexey Petrik, Russia
2. Sergey Ukolov, Russia
3. Ilya Ivanov, Russia

Female category “Triathlon Duel” 1vs1.
1. Alina Lappo, Russia
2. Anastasia Mesheriakova, Russia
3. Maria Davydova, Russia

Male category “PROFIGHTS” U75 1vs1.
1. Vyacheslav Levakov, Russia
2. Mykola Shalimov, Ukraine
3. Anatolii Iushan, Moldova

Male category "PROFIGHTS” 75-85 1vs1.
1. Alexander Nadezhdin, Russia 2. Lukas Kowal, UK
3. Maksim Skorikau, Belarus

Male category “PROFIGHTS” 85-95 1vs1.
1. Ilya Dragan, Moldova
2. Sebastian Coors, Germany
3. Maksim Slavchenko, Russia

Male category “PROFIGHTS” O95 1vs1.
1. Alexey Petrik, Russia
2. Lukasz Wojciechowski, Poland
3. Artem Semenenko, Moldova

Male Category “Group Battles” 5vs5.
1. Russia 1
2. Russia 3
3. France 1

Female Category “Group Battles” 5vs5.
1. Russia
2. Finland
3. Ukraine

Category “Mass Battles” 12vs12.
1. Russia
2. U3. Belarus

Category “Mass Battles” 30vs30.
1. Russia
2. Ukraine
3. UK

2025 Buhurt world championships: https://www.buhurtinternational.com/post/buhurt-international-world-championships-2025-official-results & https://www.buhurtinternational.com/worldchampionship2025

== Valid battle categories ==
Valid battle categories of the competitions held among national teams on the HMB and a brief explanation of them:

- "Duel Sword and Shield", fights 1 vs 1; Sword and Shield with an arming sword and a shield. The round lasts 90 seconds, with an optional 30 seconds added in case of a draw. The fighter to score the most points by striking the opponent with the sharp edge of the sword, wins the duel. The duellists that place 1st, 2nd or 3rd in this category, are invited to take part in the Triathlon Duel category.
- "Duel Sword and Buckler", fights 1 vs 1; Sword and Buckler with an arming sword and a buckler (a small shield, of maximum 35 cm in diameter). The round lasts up to 60 seconds or five points. The first duellist to win two rounds, wins the duel. The duellists that place 1st, 2nd or 3rd in this category, are invited to take part in the Triathlon Duel category.
- "Duel Longsword", fights 1 vs 1; Longsword with a two-handed sword. The round lasts 90 seconds, with an optional 30 seconds added in case of a draw. The fighter to score the most points by striking the opponent with the sharp edge of the sword, wins the duel. The duellists that place 1st, 2nd or 3rd in this category, are invited to take part in the Triathlon Duel category.
- "Duel Poleaxe", fights 1 vs 1, using a poleaxe, halberd, bardiche or similar pole-mounted weapon. The round lasts 90 seconds, with an optional 30 seconds added in case of a draw. The fighter to score the most points by striking the opponent with the sharp edge of the sword, wins the duel.
- "Triathlon Duel", fights 1 vs 1. The category consists of three rounds with the use of different weapons. The first round lasts one and a half minutes, longswords are used, the second round is held with the use of usual swords and buckler shields, three bouts up to three hits, and the third round lasts a minute and a half with the use of the standard shield and sword. Points are awarded for effective (a clear, stout) blow delivered with the weapon edge to the allowed zone. Since 2017, the Triathlon duel category is offered only to the medalists of the three duel categories that make up the triathlon; Sword and shield, Sword and buckler, Longsword.
- "Professional fight", fights 1 vs 1. The category consists of three rounds of three minutes each, pre-selected weapons are used. Points are awarded for effective (a clear, stout) blow delivered with a sword, shield edge, fist, leg, knee, and a good throw with the final blow.
- "Five vs five" the group battles "5 vs 5" are the most active kind of buhurt combat. A team fights against a team on a hard bordered list field. One five-member unit includes from five to eight fighters (five fighting in the lists, and three reserve fighters). A fighter who falls down (touches the ground with the third point of support) is out of the battle. There are 3 bouts in a battle until a team wins twice.
- “Thirty vs thirty”, a mass battle "30 vs 30", when up to thirty fighters representing a country fight on the field at the same time. A fighter who falls down is out of battle. A battle continues until the fighters of only one team remain standing on the lists, so their team wins. This category allows alliances between countries for the formation of teams.
- “Twelve vs twelve”, a mass battle "12 vs 12", when up to twelve fighters representing a country fight on the field at the same time. There are nine reserve fighters. A fighter who falls down is out of battle. A battle continues until the fighters of only one team remain standing on the lists, so their team wins.
- "All vs all" are the largest mass battles. All fighters (including those not included in a national team) of all participating countries come to the lists. The participants are divided into equal groups, but in such a way that the representatives of one country are in the same group. A fighter is out of battle if he falls down. Since the win can not be accredited to one nation, no points are awarded. In 2019, this category will be offered as a women's category only.

For the 10th anniversary in 2019, the HMBIA announced the 150 vs 150 category, a unique mass-battle event where alliances of teams from the 30vs30 category fight in the largest mass battle category ever offered.

Old categories:

- “Royal category”, a mass battle "21 vs 21", when up to twenty-one fighters representing a country fight on the field at the same time. There are six reserve fighters. A fighter who falls down is out of battle. A battle continues until the fighters of only one team remain standing on the lists, so their team wins. This category was last offered in 2018. At the 2018 summit in Serbia it was replaced with both the 12vs12 and the 30vs30 categories.
- "Archery tournament" (bow and crossbow). The tournament is held at a specially equipped place and it takes place for about 2 days. Categories and regulations may vary depending on the festival.

Valid non-battle categories

- "Contest for the best set of armour and weapons" is held among fighters of the national teams, who can demonstrate only those sets that were used in battles. Assessment is done by knight marshals, the refereeing panel and the organizers of the festival, who take into account the overall level of aesthetics, historicity of a set of armor and weapons, integrity of the individual elements, quality of the items.
- "Contest for the best authentic field camp" of a national team. Authenticity, accuracy, functionality, aesthetics and originality, as well as the size of an authentic field camp is assessed by the refereeing panel and the organizers of the festival (it takes place for one day).
- "Contest for the best fighting progress" The national team that has shown the most progress in relation to the previous years is awarded this title.
